This is a list of fire departments in New York.

New York Fire Departments

New York City

Manhattan
 Rescue 1 (Borough Wide/Hell's Kitchen)
 Engine 1/Ladder 24/Division 3 (Midtown Manhattan)
 Engine 3/Ladder 12/High Rise Unit 1/Battalion 7 (Chelsea)
 Engine 4/Ladder 15/Decon Unit 4 (Financial District)
 Engine 5/Foam 5 (Stuyvesant Town)
 Engine 6 (Lower Manhattan)
 Engine 7/Ladder 1/Battalion 1 (Civic Center)
 Engine 8/Ladder 2/Battalion 8 (Midtown Manhattan)
 Engine 9/Ladder 6/Satellite 1 (Chinatown)
 Engine 10/Ladder 10 (World Trade Center)
 Engine 14 (Chelsea/Madison Square Garden)
 Engine 15/Ladder 18/Battalion 4 (Lower East Side)
 Engine 16/Ladder 7/FDR 1 (Gramercy)
 Squad 18 (Borough Wide/West Village)
 Engine 21 (Turtle Bay)
 Engine 22/Ladder 13/FDR 2/Battalion 10 (Yorkville)
 Engine 23 (Columbus Circle)
 Engine 24/Ladder 5/Battalion 2 (Greenwich Village)
 Engine 26 (Garment Center)
 Engine 28/Ladder 11 (Alphabet City/Lower East Side)
 Engine 33/Ladder 9 (East Village)
 Engine 34/Ladder 21 (Hell's Kitchen)
 Engine 35/Ladder 14/Battalion 12 (East Harlem)
 Engine 37/Ladder 40 (Manhattanville)
 Engine 39/Ladder 16/High Rise Unit 2 (Upper East Side)
 Engine 40/Ladder 35 (Upper West Side/Lincoln Square)
 Engine 44/Haz Mat Tech Unit 44 (Upper East Side)
 Engine 47/RAC 1 (Morningside Heights)
 Engine 53/Ladder 43 (Spanish Harlem)
 Engine 54/Ladder 4/Battalion 9 (Theater District)
 Engine 55 (Little Italy)
 Engine 58/Ladder 26 (Harlem)
 Engine 59/Ladder 30 (Harlem)
 Engine 65 (Times Square)
 Engine 67 (Washington Heights)
 Engine 69/Ladder 28/Battalion 16 (Harlem)
 Engine 74 (Upper West Side)
 Engine 76/Ladder 22/Thawing Unit 76/Battalion 11 (Manhattan Valley/Upper West Side)
 Engine 80/Ladder 23 (Manhattanville)
 Engine 84/Ladder 34 (Washington Heights)
 Engine 91 (Spanish Harlem)
 Engine 93/Ladder 45/Battalion 13 (Washington Heights)
 Engine 95/Ladder 36/Foam 95 (Inwood)
 Ladder 3/Battalion 6 (Union Square)
 Ladder 8 (Tribeca)
 Ladder 20/Rescue 6/Division 1 (Soho)
 Ladder 25/Collapse Rescue 1 (Upper West Side)
 Marine 1 (Waterfront)
 Special Ops Command (Roosevelt Island)

Brooklyn
 Squad 1/Technical Response Vehicle (Borough Wide/Park Slope)
 Rescue 2/Collapse Rescue 2 (Borough Wide/Ocean Hill)
 Ladder 102/Battalion 34 (Williamsburg)
 Engine 201/Ladder 114/Battalion 40 (Bay Ridge/Sunset Park)
 Engine 202/Ladder 101/Battalion 32 (Red Hook)
 Engine 205/Ladder 118 (Brooklyn Heights)
 Engine 206/Foam 206 (East Williamsburg)
 Engine 207/Ladder 110/Satellite 6/Battalion 31/Division 11 (Ft. Greene)
 Engine 210 (Ft. Greene)
 Engine 211/Ladder 119 (Williamsburg)
 Engine 214/Ladder 111 (Bedford-Stuyvesant)
 Engine 216/Ladder 108/Battalion 35 (Williamsburg)
 Engine 217 (Bedford-Stuyvesant)
 Engine 218 (Bushwick)
 Engine 219/Ladder 105 (Ft. Greene)
 Engine 220/Ladder 122 (Park Slope)
 Engine 221/Ladder 104 (Williamsburg)
 Engine 222/Battalion 37 (Bedford-Stuyvesant/Bushwick)
 Engine 224 (Brooklyn Heights)
 Engine 225/Ladder 107/Battalion 39 (New Lots/East New York)
 Engine 226 (Downtown Brooklyn)
 Engine 227 (Brownsville)
 Engine 228/Alternate Fuel Response Unit 2 (Sunset Park)
 Engine 229/Ladder 146/Alternate Fuel Response Unit 1 (Greenpoint)
 Engine 230 (Bedford-Stuyvesant)
 Engine 231/Ladder 120/Battalion 44 (Brownsville)
 Engine 233/Ladder 176/Field Comm 1 (Ocean Hill)
 Engine 234/Ladder 123/Battalion 38 (Bedford-Stuyvesant)
 Engine 235/Battalion 57 (Bedford-Stuyvesant)
 Engine 236 (New Lots/East New York)
 Engine 237 (Bushwick)
 Engine 238/Ladder 106/Foam Tender 238 (Greenpoint)
 Engine 239 (Park Slope)
 Engine 240/Battalion 48 (Windsor Terrace)
 Engine 241/Ladder 109 (Bay Ridge)
 Engine 242 (Bay Ridge)
 Engine 243/Ladder 168/Battalion 42 (Bath Beach)
 Engine 245/Ladder 161/Battalion 43 (Coney Island)
 Engine 246/Ladder 169 (Sheepshead Bay/Brighton Beach)
 Engine 247/Foam 247/Thawing Unit 64 (Boro Park)
 Engine 248/Battalion 41 (Flatbush)
 Engine 249/Ladder 113 (Flatbush)
 Engine 250 (Parkville)
 Squad 252 (Borough Wide/Bushwick)
 Engine 253 (Bensonhurst)
 Engine 254/Ladder 153 (Gravesend)
 Engine 255/Ladder 157 (Flatbush)
 Engine 257/Ladder 170/Highway Response Unit 170/Battalion 58 (Canarsie)
 Engine 271/Ladder 124/Battalion 28 (Wyckoff Heights)
 Engine 276/Ladder 156/Battalion 33 (Midwood/Flatlands)
 Engine 277/Ladder 112 (Bushwick)
 Engine 279/Ladder 131 (Red Hook)
 Engine 280/Ladder 132 (Prospect Park North)
 Engine 281/Ladder 147 (Flatbush)
 Engine 282/Ladder 148 (Boro Park)
 Engine 283/Division 15 (Brownsville)
 Engine 284/Ladder 149/Satellite 3 (Dyker Heights)
 Engine 290/Ladder 103 (East New York)
 Engine 309/Ladder 159/Highway Response Unit 159 (Flatlands)
 Engine 310/Ladder 174 (East Flatbush)
 Engine 318/Ladder 166 (Coney Island)
 Engine 321/Foam 321/Brush Fire Unit 6 (Marine Park)
 Engine 323 (Mill Basin)
 Engine 330/Ladder 172/Thawing Unit 330 (Bensonhurst)
 Engine 332/Ladder 175 (East New York)
 Marine 6 (Waterfront)
 Gerrittsen Beach V.F.D.

Bronx
 Rescue 3/Collapse Rescue 3 (Borough Wide/Bathgate)
 Engine 38/Ladder 51 (Eastchester)
 Squad 41 (Borough Wide/Melrose)
 Engine 42 (Mt. Hope)
 Engine 43/Ladder 59 (Morris Heights)
 Engine 45/Ladder 58/Battalion 18 (West Farms)
 Engine 46/Ladder 27 (Tremont)
 Engine 48/Ladder 56/Division 7 (Fordham)
 Engine 50/Ladder 19/Battalion 26 (Morrisania)
 Engine 52/Ladder 52 (Riverdale)
 Engine 60/Ladder 17/Battalion 14 (Mott Haven/South Bronx)
 Squad 61/Battalion 20 (Borough Wide/Westchester)
 Engine 62/Ladder 32 (Olinville)
 Engine 63/Ladder 39/Battalion 15 (Wakefield)
 Engine 64/Ladder 47 (Castle Hill)
 Engine 66/Ladder 61 (Co-op City)
 Engine 68/Ladder 49 (Highbridge)
 Engine 70/Ladder 53 (City Island)
 Engine 71/Ladder 55/Division 6 (Melrose/South Bronx)
 Engine 72/Satellite 2 (Throgs Neck)
 Engine 73/Ladder 42 (East Morrisania)
 Engine 75/Ladder 33/Battalion 19 (Fordham)
 Engine 79/Ladder 37/Battalion 27 (Norwood)
 Engine 81/Ladder 46 (Kingsbridge)
 Engine 82/Ladder 31 (West Farms/South Bronx)
 Engine 83/Ladder 29 (Pt. Morris)
 Engine 88/Ladder 38 (Belmont)
 Engine 89/Ladder 50 (Throgs Neck)
 Engine 90/Ladder 41 (Van Nest)
 Engine 92/Ladder 44/Battalion 17 (Morrisania/South Bronx)
 Engine 94/Ladder 48/Battalion 3 (Hunts Point)
 Engine 96/Ladder 54/Foam 96 (Clason Point)
 Engine 97/Thawing Unit 97 (Eastchester)
 Edgewater Park Volunteer Hose Co. #1

Queens
 Ladder 116/Collapse Rescue 4 (Queensbridge)
 Engine 251 (Glen Oaks)
 Engine 258/Ladder 115 (Long Island City)
 Engine 259/Ladder 128/Battalion 45 (Sunnyside)
 Engine 260/Foam 260 (Ravenswood)
 Engine 262 (South Astoria)
 Engine 263/Ladder 117 (Astoria Heights)
 Engine 264/Engine 328/Ladder 134 (Far Rockaway)
 Engine 265/Ladder 121/Battalion 47 (Edgemere)
 Engine 266/Thawing Unit 266/Brush Fire Unit 7 (Seaside/Rockaway Beach)
 Engine 268/Ladder 137 (Rockaway Park)
 Squad 270/Division 13 (Borough Wide/Richmond Hill)
 Engine 273/Ladder 129 (Downtown Flushing)
 Engine 274/Battalion 52 (Flushing)
 Engine 275/Ladder 133 (St. Albans/South Jamaica)
 Engine 285/Ladder 142 (Ozone Park)
 Engine 286/Ladder 135 (Glendale)
 Engine 287/Ladder 136/Battalion 46 (Elmhurst)
 Squad 288/Haz-Mat 1 (Borough Wide/Maspeth)
 Engine 289/Ladder 138 (Corona)
 Engine 291/Ladder 140 (Ridgewood)
 Engine 292/Rescue 4 (Woodside - R4 runs Borough Wide)
 Engine 293/Thawing Unit 65 (Woodhaven)
 Engine 294/Foam 294/Ladder 143 (Richmond Hill)
 Engine 295/Ladder 144 (Whitestone)
 Engine 297/Ladder 130 (College Point)
 Engine 298/Ladder 127/Battalion 50 (Hillside/Jamaica)
 Engine 299/Ladder 152 (Utopia) 
 Engine 301/Ladder 150 (Hollis)
 Engine 302/Ladder 155 (Rochdale)
 Engine 303/Ladder 126 (South Jamaica)
 Engine 304/Ladder 162 (Queens Village)
 Engine 305/Ladder 151 (Forest Hills)
 Engine 306 (Bayside)
 Engine 307/Ladder 154 (Jackson Heights)
 Engine 308/JFK Hose Wagon/Battalion 51 (Ozone Park)
 Engine 311/Ladder 158 (Brookville/Springfield Gardens)
 Engine 312/Battalion 49 (Astoria)
 Engine 313/Ladder 164 (Douglaston)
 Engine 314 (Rosedale)
 Engine 315/Ladder 125 (Hillcrest)
 Engine 316/LaGuardia Hose Wagon 316 (East Elmhurst)
 Engine 317/Ladder 165/Battalion 54 (St. Albans)
 Engine 319 (Middle Village)
 Engine 320/Ladder 167 (Bayside)
 Engine 324/Satellite 4/Division 14 (Corona)
 Engine 325/Ladder 163 (Woodside)
 Engine 326/Ladder 160/Battalion 53 (Oakland Gardens)
 Engine 329/Manifold Wagon 329/ATRV 329 (Ft. Tilden)
 Engine 331/Ladder 173 (Howard Beach)
 F.D.N.Y. Maintenance Shops
 Broad Channel V.F.D.
 Point Breeze V.F.D.
 Rockaway Point V.F.D.
 Roxbury V.F.D.
 West Hamilton Beach V.F.D. & Amb. Corps

Staten Island
 Squad 8/Squad 8 Haz Mat Tech Unit (Borough Wide/Chelsea)
 Engine 151/Ladder 76/Thawing Unit 151 (Tottenville)
 Engine 152/Foam 152/Battalion 21 (Rosebank)
 Engine 153/Ladder 77 (Stapleton)
 Engine 155/Ladder 78 (New Brighton)
 Engine 156/Brush Fire Unit 3 (West Brighton)
 Engine 157/Ladder 80 (Pt. Richmond)
 Engine 158/Brush Fire Unit 158/ATV 158 (Mariners Harbor)
 Engine 159/Satellite 5 (Dongan Hills)
 Engine 160/Rescue 5/Collapse Rescue 5/Brush Fire Unit 160/Special Ops Command 160/ATV 160/TAC Support Unit 2/Division 8 (Concord - Rescue 5 responds Borough Wide)
 Engine 161/Ladder 81/Brush Fire Unit 5 (South Beach)
 Engine 162/Ladder 82/Battalion 23 (Great Kills)
 Engine 163/Ladder 83 (Westerleigh)
 Engine 164/Ladder 84/Brush Fire Unit 1/Brush Fire Unit 164/ATV 164/MARC 164 (Huguenot)
 Engine 165/Ladder 85/Haz Mat Tech Unit 165 (New Dorp)
 Engine 166/Ladder 86/Brush Fire Unit 2 (Graniteville)
 Engine 167/Ladder 87/Foam 167/Brush Fire Unit 4 (Annadale)
 Engine 168 (Rossville)
 Ladder 79/Battalion 22 (West New Brighton/North Shore)
 Marine 9 (Waterfront)
 Metropolitan Fire Assoc. Inc.
 Oceanic Hook & Ladder Co. #1
 Richmond Engine Co. #1

Albany County
 1 – Albany Fire Department (New York) (8 Stations)
 2 – Altamont Fire Dist.
 3 – Berne Fire Dist. #3 (2 Stations)
 4 – Boght Community Fire Dist. #1
 5 – Coeymans Fire Dist. #5
 6 – Coeymans Hollow Fire Dist. #6
 7 – Cohoes F.D. (3 Sta.'s)
 8 – Colonie Fire Co. #2
 9 – Delmar Fire Dist. #2 (2 Sta.'s)
 10 – Elsmere Fire Dist. #3
 11 – Ft. Hunter Fire Dist.
 12 – Fuller Rd. Fire Dist. #3
 13 – Green Island Fire Dist.
 14 – Guilderland Fire Dist.
 15 – Guilderland Center Fire Dist.
 16 – Knox Fire Dist. #16
 17 – Latham Fire Dist. #4 (2 Stations)
 18 – Medusa Fire Dist. #18
 19 – Maplewood Fire Dist. #5
 20 – McKownville Fire Dist. 
 21 – Menands Fire Dist. #6
 22 – Midway Fire Dist. #7 (2 Stations)
 23 – New Salem Fire Dist. #23 (2 Stations)
 24 – North Bethlehem V.F.D.
 25 – Onesquethaw Fire Dist. #25 (3 Stations)
 26 – Ravena Hose Co. #8
 27 – Rensselaerville Fire Dist. #27
 28 – Schuyler Heights Fire Dist. #8
 29 – Selkirk Fire Co. #4 (3 Sta.'s)
 30 – Shaker Road Loudonville Fire Dist. #9 (2 Stations)
 31 – Slingerlands Fire Dist. #1 (2 Stations)
 32 – Stanford Heights Fire Dist. #10 (2 Stations)
 33 – Tri Village Fire Dist. #33
 34 – Verdoy Fire Dist. #11
 35 – Voorheesville Fire Dist. #35
 36 – Watervliet F.D.
 37 – Albany Int. Airport C/F/R
 38 – West Albany Fire Dist. #12 (2 Stations)
 39 – Westerlo Fire Dist. #39 (3 Stations)
 40 – Westmere Fire Dist.
 41 – Watervliet Arsenal F.D.
 50 – Altamont Rescue/Squad
 51 – Delmar-Bethlehem E.M.S.
 52 – Five Quad V.A.S.
 53 – Helderberg Amb. Inc. (2 Stations)
 54 – Rensselaerville Amb. (disbanded)
 55 – Albany Co. Sheriff's Office E.M.S./Town of Colonie E.M.S.
 56 – Voorheesville Area Amb. Service
 57 – Western Turnpike Rescue/Squad Inc.
 58 – Ravena Rescue/Squad
 59 – Westerlo Rescue/Squad Inc.

Allegany County

 A.E. Crandall Hook & Ladder Co. (Alfred, NY)
 Alfred Amb.
 Alfred Sta. V.F.C.
 Allentown V.F.C.
 Alma V.F.C. #1 Inc.
 Almond V.F.C. & Amb.
 Amity Rescue/Squad Inc. (Belmont, NY)
 Andover V.F.D. & V.A.C.
 Angelica Hose Co. #1 & Rescue/Squad
 Belfast V.F.D. & Amb.
 Belmont V.F.C.
 Birdsall V.F.D.
 Bolivar V.F.D. & Amb.
 Canaseraga V.F.D. & Amb.
 Caneadea V.F.D.
 Centerville Memorial V.F.D.
 Clarksville V.F.C. & Amb.
 Cuba V.F.D.
 Cuba Amb.
 William P. Brooks Hose Co. (Fillmore, NY)
 Friendship V.F.D.
 Friendship Amb. Squad
 Houghton V.F.D. & Amb.
 Medical Transport Services (Scio, NY)
 New Hudson V.F.C.
 Oramel V.F.D.
 Richburg V.F.C. Inc.
 Rushford V.F.D. & Amb.
 Scio V.F.C. (2 Sta.'s)
 Short Tract V.F.D.
 Wellsville V.F.D. (3 Sta.'s)
 Wellsville V.A.C.
 Whitesville V.F.D.
 Independence Emer. Squad (Whitesville, NY)
 Willing Vol. Hose Co. #1 (Wellsville, NY)
 Wiscoy-Rossburg V.F.C. Inc. (Fillmore, NY)
 Genesee V.F.D. (Genesee, PA)
 Shinglehouse V.F.D. (Shinglehouse, PA)
 Eldred Borough V.F.D. (Eldred, PA)

Broome County
 21 – Binghamton Fire Department (5 Stations)
 22 – Deposit V.F.D. (Delaware Co.)
 23 – Lisle V.F.C.
 24 – Whitney Point V.F.D.
 25 – Endicott F.D.
 26 – Johnson City F.D. (2 Stations)
 27 – Binghamton Psychiatric Center F.D. (disbanded)
 28 – Windsor V.F.C. (2 Sta.'s)
 29 – West Corners V.F.D. (2 Sta.'s)
 31 – Endwell F.D. (3 Sta.'s)
 32 – Vestal V.F.D. (4 Sta.'s)
 33 – Maine V.F.C.
 34 – West Endicott Hose Co. #1
 35 – Port Dickinson V.F.C.
 36 – Killawog V.F.C.
 37 – Port Crane V.F.C. (2 Sta.'s)
 38 – Kirkwood V.F.C. (2 Sta.'s)
 39 – Chenango Bridge V.F.C. Inc. (2 Sta.'s)
 40 – Broome Co. Public Safety
 41 – Huron Campus Emergency Services (I.B.M.) (Endicott, NY)
 42 – S.U.N.Y. Binghamton F.D. (disbanded)
 43 – Harpursville V.F.D. (2 Sta.'s)
 44 – Chenango Forks V.F.C.
 45 – G.S.A. Federal Bldg. (Binghamton, NY)
 46 – Conklin V.F.C. (3 Sta.'s)
 47 – Glen Aubrey V.F.C. Inc. (2 Sta.'s)
 48 – Nanticoke V.F.C. Inc. (disbanded)
 49 – Sanitaria Springs V.F.C.
 51 – West Colesville V.F.C.
 52 – Ouaquaga V.F.C.
 53 – Union Center V.F.C. Inc. (2 Sta.'s)
 54 – West Windsor V.F.C. Inc.
 55 – Hillcrest V.F.D.
 56 – East Maine V.F.C.
 57 – Choconut Center V.F.C. Inc.
 58 – Town of Binghamton V.F.C. Inc.. (3 Sta.'s)
 59 – Five Mile Point V.F.C. (2 Sta.'s)
 61 – Triangle V.F.C.
 62 – Greater Binghamton Airport F.D.
 63 – Prospect Terrace V.F.C.
 64 – Castle Creek V.F.C. (disbanded)
 65 – Broome Developmental Center F.D. (Binghamton, NY)
 66 – Chenango V.F.C. Inc (2 Sta.'s)
 71 – City of Binghamton E.M.S.
 72 – Broome Volunteer Emergency Squad (Binghamton, NY)
 73 – Chenango Ambulance Services Inc.
 74 – Colesville Volunteer Ambulance Service
 75 – Deposit Emergency Squad (Delaware Co.)
 76 – Harpur's Ferry Student Volunteer Ambulance Service (S.U.N.Y. Binghamton)
 78 – Superior Ambulance (Binghamton, NY)
 79 – Union Volunteer Emergency Squad (3 Sta.'s)
 81 – Vestal Volunteer Emergency Squad Inc.
 82 – West Windsor Ambulance (disbanded)
 83 – Whitney Point V.F.D. Emergency Squad (disbanded)
 84 – Windsor Emergency Services (2 Sta.'s)
 85 – Maine Emergency Squad Inc.

Cattaraugus County

Dist. #1
 Conewango V.F.D.
 Dayton V.F.C.
 Gowanda V.F.C. Co. Inc. (2 Sta.'s)
 Leon V.F.C. #1
 Perrysburg V.F.C. #1 Inc.
 South Dayton V.F.C. #1 Inc.
 Versailles V.F.C.

Dist. #2
 Arcade V.F.D. (Wyoming Co.)
 Delevan V.F.D. & Rescue/Squad
 Farmersville V.F.D.
 Franklinville V.F.D.
 Ischua V.F.D.
 Lyndon V.F.C.
 Machias V.F.D. (aka W.M. Weller Hose Co. Inc.)
 Yorkshire V.F.D. (aka Crystal Hose Co.)

Dist. #3
 Allegany Indian Reservation V.F.D.
 Cattaraugus V.F.C. Inc.
 Cattaraugus Area Ambulance Service
 Coldspring V.F.C.
 East Randolph V.F.C. Inc.
 Frewsburg V.F.C. (2 Sta.'s both in Chautauqua Co.)
 Kill Buck V.F.D.
 Little Valley V.F.D.
 Randolph V.F.C. (2 Sta.'s)
 Salamanca F.D. & Amb. (2 Sta.'s)

Dist. #4
 Allegany Engine Co. Inc. (2 Sta.'s)
 Hinsdale F.D.
 Knapp Creek V.F.D.
 Limestone V.F.D. (aka Carrollton Joint Fire Dist.) (2 Sta.'s)
 Olean City F.D. (2 Sta.'s)
 Town of Olean V.F.D.
 Portville V.F.D.
 Westons Mills V.F.D. (aka Kinney Hose Co.)
 Trans Am Ambulance (Olean, NY)

Dist. #5
 East Otto V.F.C. (aka William C. Edmunds V.F.C.)
 Ellicottville V.F.D.
 Great Valley V.F.C.
 Humphrey V.F.D.
 Otto V.F.C.
 Mansfield V.F.C.
 West Valley Vol. Hose Co. #1 (2 Sta.'s)

Cayuga County
 01 – Auburn F.D. (2 Sta.'s)
 02 – Aurelius V.F.D. (2 Sta.'s)
 03 – Aurora V.F.D.
 04 – Cato V.F.D.
 05 – Cayuga V.F.D.
 06 – Fair Haven V.F.D.
 07 – Fleming Fire Co. #1
 08 – Fleming Fire Co. #2
 09 – Genoa V.F.D.
 10 – Ira V.F.D.
 11 – King Ferry V.F.D.
 12 – Locke V.F.D.
 13 – Meridian V.F.D. (disbanded)
 14 – Moravia V.F.C.
 15 – Montezuma V.F.D.
 16 – New Hope V.F.D.
 17 – Owasco V.F.D. (2 Sta.'s)
 18 – Poplar Ridge V.F.C.
 19 – Port Byron V.F.D.
 20 – Scipio V.F.C.
 21 – Sennett V.F.D. (2 Sta.'s)
 22 – Throop V.F.D.
 23 – Union Springs V.F.D.
 24 – Victory V.F.D.
 25 – Weedsport V.F.D.
 26 – Long Hill V.F.D.
 27 – Sempronius V.F.C.
 28 – West Niles V.F.C.
 29 – Conquest V.F.C.
 American Medical Response (A.M.R.) (Throop, NY)
 Cato Ira Meridian Victory Ambulance Corps (C.I.M.V.A.C.)
 Four Town First Aid Squad (Moravia, NY)
 Southern Cayuga Instant Aid (Poplar Ridge, NY)
 TLC Ambulance (Auburn, NY)

Chautauqua County

Battalion 1
 Dunkirk F.D. (3 Sta.'s)
 Fredonia V.F.D.
 10 – Cassadaga V.F.D.
 11 – East Dunkirk V.F.C. #1
 12 – West Dunkirk V.F.C. Inc.
 13 – Forestville Fire Department, Inc
 14 – Irving V.F.D.
 15 – Lily Dale V.F.C.
 16 – Sheridan V.F.D.
 17 – 
 Silver Creek V.F.D.
 Silver Creek Vol. Emer. Squad
 18 – Stockton V.F.C. Inc.
 19 – Sunset Bay V.F.C. #1 Inc.
 51 – Hanover Hose Co. #1
 60 – South Dayton V.F.C. #1 Inc. (Cattaraugus Co.)
 CCEMS Flycar Medic 71 (Sheridan, NY)
 CCEMS Ambulance 72 (Sheridan, NY)

Battalion 2
 20 – Brocton V.F.D.
 21 – Chautauqua Fire Dist. #1
 22 – Dewittville V.F.D.
 23 – Findley Lake V.F.D.
 24 – Hartfield V.F.C. Inc.
 25 – Mayville V.F.D. (2 Sta.'s)
 26 – Portland V.F.D. #1
 27 – Ripley Hose Co. #1 (2 Sta.'s)
 28 – Stanley Hose Co. Inc.
 29 – Westfield V.F.D.
 Chautauqua County Hazmat 7
 Chautauqua County Tech. Rescue
 CCEMS Flycar Medic 72 (Mayville, NY)

Battalion 3
 30 – Ashville V.F.D. (2 Sta.'s)
 31 – Busti V.F.D.
 32 – Celoron Hose Co. #1 (2 Sta.'s)
 33 – Clymer V.F.D.
 34 – Frewsburg V.F.C. (2 Sta.'s) (Cattaraugus Co.)
 35 – Jamestown F.D. (3 Sta.'s)
 36 – Kiantone Independent Fire Co. (2 Sta.'s)
 37 – Lakewood V.F.C.
 38 – Panama V.F.C. (2 Sta.'s)
 63 – Sugar Grove V.F.D. (2 Sta.'s) (Warren Co., PA)
 Alstar E.M.S. (Jamestown, NY)
 CCEMS Flycar Medic 73 (Lakewood, NY)
 CCEMS Ambulance 71 (Celoron, NY)

Battalion 4
 40 – Falconer V.F.D.
 41 – Cherry Creek V.F.D.
 42 – Ellery Center V.F.D.
 43 – Ellington V.F.D.
 44 – Bemus Point V.F.D. Inc.
 45 – Fluvanna Fire Dist. (2 Sta.'s)
 46 – Gerry V.F.D.
 47 – Kennedy V.F.D. #1
 48 – Maple Springs V.F.C. Inc.
 49 – Sinclairville V.F.C. #1
 74-CCEMS Flycar Medic 74(Falconer,NY)

Chemung County
 01 – Elmira Corning Regional Airport F.D.
 02 – Baldwin V.F.D. (2 Sta.'s)
 03 – Big Flats V.F.C.
 04 – Breesport V.F.D.
 05 – Chemung V.F.C.
 06 – Elmira City F.D. (3 Sta.'s)(Career Dept.)
 07 – Elmira Heights V.F.D.
 08 – Erin V.F.C.
 09 – Golden Glow V.F.C. (2 Sta.'s)
 10 – Horseheads V.F.D.
 11 – Millport V.F.C. Inc.
 12 – Pine City V.F.D.
 13 – Elmira Correctional Facility F.D.
 14 – Southport V.F.D.
 15 – Tompkins Corners V.F.C.
 16 – Town and Country V.F.D.
 17 – Van Etten V.F.D. (disbanded)
 18 – Webbs Mills V.F.D. (2 Sta.'s)
 19 – Wellsburg V.F.D.
 20 – West Hill V.F.D. (disbanded)
 22 – East Hill V.F.D. Inc.
 23 – West Elmira V.F.D.
 24 – Community Fire & Rescue
 Erway Ambulance Service (3 Sta.'s)

Chenango County
 11 – Afton Hose Co.
 12 – Bainbridge V.F.D.
 13 – Borden Hose Co. #1 (2 Sta.'s)
 14 – Brisben V.F.D.
 15 – Earlville V.F.C. (2 Sta.'s – Madison Co.)
 16 – Coventry V.F.C. Inc.
 17 – Preston V.F.D.
 18 – Genegantslet V.F.C. Inc.
 19 – Guilford V.F.D.
 21 – Greene V.F.D.
 22 – McDonough V.F.D.
 23 – Norwich F.D. & Amb.
 24 – North Norwich V.F.D.
 25 – New Berlin V.F.D. & Amb.
 26 – Oxford V.F.D.
 27 – Plymouth V.F.D. & Emer. Squad
 28 – Sherburne V.F.D.
 29 – Smyrna V.F.D.
 31 – South New Berlin V.F.D. & Rescue Squad
 32 – South Otselic V.F.D. & Amb.
 33 – Pharsalia V.F.C.
 36 – Greene Emer. Squad
 Cooperstown Medical Transport (Norwich, NY)

Clinton County
 09 – E.M.T. of C.V.P.H. Ambulance (Plattsburgh, NY)
 10 – Altona V.F.D.
 11 – Au Sable Forks V.F.D. (Essex Co.)
 12 – Beekmantown V.F.D. (2 Sta.'s)
 13 – Cadyville V.F.D.
 14 – Niagara Hose Co. #1 (Champlain, NY)
 15 – Chazy V.F.D.
 16 – Churubusco V.F.D.
 17 – Clinton Correctional Facility F.D. (Dannemora, NY)
 18 – Cumberland Head V.F.D.
 19 – Dannemora V.F.D. (aka Walter N. Thayer Hose Co.)
 20 – Ellenburg Center V.F.D.
 21 – Ellenburg Depot V.F.D.
 22 – Hemmingford Fire Service (Hemmingford, QC)
 23 – Keeseville V.F.D.
 24 – Lyon Mountain V.F.C. Inc.
 25 – Mooers V.F.D. (2 Sta.'s)
 26 – Morrisonville V.F.D.
 27 – Peru V.F.D.
 28 – Plattsburgh F.D. (2 Sta.'s)
 29 – Rescue Hose Co. #5 ***(disbanded)***
 30 – Rouses Point V.F.D.
 31 – Saranac V.F.D. (2 Sta.'s)
 32 – South Plattsburgh V.F.D. (2 Sta.'s)
 33 – West Chazy V.F.D.
 34 – Plattsburgh International Airport F.D. (Formally Plattsburgh Air Force Base F.D.)
 35 – Town of Plattsburgh District #3 V.F.D. (2 Sta.'s)
 36 – Alburgh V.F.D. (Grand Isle Co., VT)
 37 – Isle LaMotte V.F.D. (Grand Isle Co., VT)
 38 – LaColle V.F.D. (LaColle, QC)
 39 – St. Paul V.F.D. (St. Paul De L'lle-Aux-Noix, QC)
 40 – Morrisonville Schuyler Falls Vol. Amb. Service
 41 – Au Sable Forks Vol. Amb. Service (Essex Co.)
 42 – St. Bernard V.F.D. (St. Bernard de LaColle, QC)
 43 – Clinton Co. Office of Emergency Services (Plattsburgh, NY)
 46 – Champlain-Mooers E.M.S.
 49 – Town of Clinton Ambulance
 LaMoille Ambulance Service
 Varin's Ambulance Service (2 Sta.'s)

Columbia County
 02 – Chatham Rescue/Squad (2 Sta.'s)
 03 – Community Rescue/Squad (Copake)
 04 – Greenport Rescue/Squad
 06 – Philmont Rescue/Squad (disbanded)
 08 – Valatie Rescue/Squad
 11 – Columbia County 9-1-1
 12 – A.B. Shaw Fire Co. #1 (Claverack)
 14 – Copake Fire Co. #1
 19 – Elizaville Pumper Co. #2
 22 – Ghent V.F.C. #1
 24 – Greenport V.F.D. – Pumper Co. #3
 25 – Greenport V.F.D. – Pumper Co. #1
 26 – Greenport V.F.D. – Becraft Pumper Co. #2
 27 – Hudson F.D. – J.W. Edmonds Hose Co. #1
 28 – Hudson F.D. – H.W. Rogers Hose Co. #2
 29 – Lebanon Valley Protective Assn. Inc. – West Lebanon Sta.
 30 – Hudson F.D. – J.W. Hoysradt Hose & Chemical Co. #8
 31 – Hudson F.D. – Phoenix Hose Co. #5 (disbanded)
 32 – Hudson F.D. – C.H. Evans Hook & Ladder #3
 33 – Hillsdale Fire Co. #1
 34 – Canaan Protective Fire Co. Inc.
 35 – Palmer Engine & Hose Co. (Kinderhook)
 40 – Mellenville V.F.C. #1
 43 – North Chatham V.F.D.
 45 – Niverville V.F.D. (2 Sta.'s)
 47 – Philmont V.F.C. #1
 49 – Stockport V.F.C. #1
 50 – Stottville V.F.C. #2
 51 – Spencertown V.F.C.
 52 – Stuyvesant V.F.C. #1
 55 – Valatie V.F.D.
 56 – Taghkanic V.F.C. #1 (2 Sta.'s)
 57 – West Ghent V.F.C.
 58 – Chatham V.F.D.
 60 – Clermont V.F.D. (2 Sta.'s)
 63 – Linlithgo Pumper Co. #3 (disbanded)
 64 – Hudson F.D. – Washington Hose Co. #3 (disbanded)
 65 – Stuyvesant Falls V.F.C. #2
 70 – Germantown Hose Co. #1
 75 – East Chatham V.F.C. Inc.
 76 – Red Rock V.F.C.
 79 – Ancram V.F.C.
 80 – Austerlitz V.F.C.
 81 – Lebanon Valley Protective Assn. Inc. – New Lebanon Sta.
 83 – Livingston Pumper Co. #1
 84 – Northern Dutchess Paramedics (NDP) (Livingston)
 85 – Tri Village V.F.C. (2 Sta.'s)
 86 – Craryville V.F.C. #1
 90 – Churchtown Fire Co. #1

Cortland County
 01 – Cincinnatus V.F.D. & Ambulance (Separate Sta.'s)
 02 – Cortland City F.D. (2 Sta.'s)
 03 – Cuyler V.F.D. (2 Sta.'s)
 04 – Harford V.F.D.
 05 – Homer V.F.D.
 06 – Marathon V.F.D. & Marathon Area Volunteer Amb. Corps (Separate Sta.'s)
 07 – McGraw V.F.D.
 08 – Preble V.F.D.
 09 – Truxton V.F.D.
 10 – Virgil V.F.D.
 11 – Willet V.F.D.
 12 – Cortland Co. Fire Control
 13 – Cortlandville V.F.D. (2 Sta.'s)
 TLC Ambulance (Cortland, NY)

Delaware County

 01 – Andes V.F.D.
 02 – Arena V.F.D.
 03 – Arkville V.F.D.
 04 – Bloomville V.F.D. (2 Sta.'s)
 05 – Bovina Center V.F.D.
 06 – Cooks Falls-Horton V.F.C.
 07 – Davenport V.F.D.
 08 – Delhi V.F.D. (2 Sta.'s)
 09 – Deposit V.F.D.
 10 – Downsville V.F.D.
 11 – East Branch V.F.D.
 12 – East Meredith V.F.D.
 13 – Fleischmanns V.F.D.
 14 – Franklin V.F.D.
 15 – Grand Gorge Hose Co. #1 & Rescue/Squad
 16 – Halcottsville V.F.D. Inc. (aka Wawaka Hose #1)
 17 – Hancock V.F.D. & Rescue/Squad
 18 – Hobart V.F.D. & Emergency Squad
 19 – Margaretville V.F.D. & Amb.
 20 – Masonville V.F.D.
 21 – Meridale V.F.D.
 22 – Pindars Corners V.F.D.
 23 – Roxbury V.F.C. Inc.
 24 – Sidney V.F.D. & Emergency Squad (2 Sta.'s)
 25 – Sidney Center V.F.D. & Emergency Squad
 26 – South Kortright V.F.D.
 27 – Stamford V.F.D.
 28 – Treadwell V.F.D.
 29 – Trout Creek V.F.C. Inc.
 30 – Walton V.F.D.
 Cooperstown Medical Transport (C.M.T.) ***(Soon to be American Medical Response (A.M.R.))***
 Hatzoloh Fleischmanns Ambulance 
 Margaretville Memorial Hospital Ambulance

Dutchess County
 14 – Dutchess Co. Emergency Response (Hyde Park)
 31 – Amenia Fire Co. #1 Inc.
 32 – Arlington F.D. (4 Sta.'s)
 33 – City of Beacon F.D. (3 Sta.'s)
 34 – Beekman V.F.C.
 35 – Chelsea V.F.C.
 36 – John H. Ketcham Hose Co. Inc. (Dover Plains – 2 Sta.'s)
 37 – Dutchess Junction V.F.D.
 38 – East Clinton V.F.D.
 39 – East Fishkill V.F.D. (7 Sta.'s)
 40 – None
 41 – Fairview F.D.
 42 – Fishkill V.F.D.
 43 – Glenham V.F.D.
 44 – Hillside V.F.D.
 45 – Hughsonville F.D.
 46 – Hyde Park V.F.D.
 47 – LaGrange F.D. (3 Sta.'s)
 48 – Milan V.F.D. (3 Sta.'s)
 49 – Millbrook V.F.D.
 50 – None
 51 – Millerton V.F.D.
 52 – New Hackensack V.F.D.
 53 – New Hamburg V.F.D. (2 Sta.'s)
 54 – Pawling F.D. (3 Sta.'s)
 55 – Pine Plains V.F.D.
 56 – Pleasant Valley V.F.D. (2 Sta.'s)
 57 – Poughkeepsie F.D. (3 Sta.'s)
 58 – Red Hook V.F.C. Inc.
 59 – Rhinebeck V.F.D.
 60 – None
 61 – Rhinecliff V.F.C.
 62 – Rombout V.F.C. (2 Sta.'s)
 63 – Roosevelt V.F.D. (3 Sta.'s)
 64 – Staatsburg V.F.D. (2 Sta.'s)
 65 – Stanford V.F.D.
 66 – Tivoli V.F.C. #5
 67 – Union Vale V.F.D. (2 Sta.'s)
 68 – Wappingers Falls V.F.D. (2 Sta.'s)
 69 – Wassaic V.F.C. Inc.
 70 – None
 71 – West Clinton V.F.D. (2 Sta.'s)
 72-80 – None
 81 – EMStar (Poughkeepsie)
 82 – Beacon V.A.C. Inc.
 83 – Mobile Life Support Services (Wappingers Falls)
 84 – Northern Dutchess Paramedics (N.D.P.) (6 Sta.'s)
 85 – EMStar (Wappingers Falls)
 86 – Mobile Life Support Services Inc. (6 Sta.'s)
 87 – Mobile Life Support Services Inc. (Fishkill)
 88-90 – None
 91 – F.D.V.A. Castle Point
 92 – Dutchess Co. Airport Fire/Rescue
 93 – Green Haven Correctional Facility F.D. 
 94 – Fishkill Correctional Facility F.D. ***(NOW CLOSED)***
 95 – Hudson River Psychiatric Center F.D. ***(NOW CLOSED)***
 96 – I.B.M. East Fishkill Emergency Control
 97 – I.B.M. Poughkeepsie Emergency Control
 98 – Mattawan Correctional Facility F.D. ***(NOW CLOSED)***
 99 – Wassaic Developmental Center F.D. ***(NOW CLOSED)***

Erie County
 Buffalo Fire Department 
 Buffalo Niagara International Airport
 Town of Alden Fire Dist. – 
 Alden V.F.C. Inc. (2 Sta.'s)
 Crittenden V.F.D.
 Millgrove V.F.D. Inc.
 Town of Amherst Fire Dist. – 
 East Amherst V.F.D. Inc. (2 Sta.'s)
 Eggertsville Hose Co.
 Ellicott Creek V.F.C. Inc. (2 Sta.'s)
 Getzville V.F.C. Inc. (2 Sta.'s)
 Main Transit V.F.C. Inc. (2 Sta.'s)
 North Amherst V.F.C. Inc.
 North Bailey V.F.C. Inc.
 Snyder V.F.D.
 Swormville V.F.C. Inc.
 Williamsville V.F.D. (2 Sta.'s)
 Town of Aurora Fire Dist. – 
 East Aurora V.F.D.
 West Falls V.F.C.
 Town of Boston Fire Dist. – 
 Boston V.F.C. (2 Sta.'s)
 Boston Emergency Squad
 North Boston V.F.C. Inc.
 Patchin V.F.C. (2 Sta.'s)
 Town of Brant Fire Dist. – 
 Brant V.F.C. #1 Inc.
 Farnham V.F.D.
 Cattaraugus Indian Reservation Fire Dist. – 
 Cattaraugus Indian Reservation V.F.D.
 Town of Cheektowaga Fire Dist. – 
 1 – 
 Doyle Hose Co. #1
 Doyle Hose Co. #2
 2 – Rescue Hose Co. #1
 3 – Forks Hose Co. #2 (2 Sta.'s)
 4 – U-Crest V.F.C. #4
 5 – Pine Hill Hose Co. #5
 6 – Cleveland Hill Hose Co. #6
 7 – Sloan Active Hose Co. #1
 8 – Hy-View Hose Co. #8
 9 – Bellevue V.F.C. #9
 10 – South Line V.F.C. #10 (2 Sta.'s)
 Town of Clarence Fire Dist. – 
 Clarence V.F.C. #1
 Clarence Center V.F.C.
 Harris Hill V.F.C.
 Town of Colden Fire Dist. – 
 Colden V.F.C. Inc. (2 Sta.'s)
 Town of Collins Fire Dist. – 
 Collins V.F.C.
 Collins Center V.F.D. Inc.
 Gowanda V.F.C. Inc. (2 Sta.'s)
 Gowanda Ambulance Service
 Town of Concord Fire Dist. – 
 East Concord V.F.D. Inc.
 Mortons Corners V.F.D.
 Springville V.F.C. Inc. (2 Sta.'s)
 Town of Eden Fire Dist. – 
 East Eden V.F.C.
 Eden V.F.D. #1
 Eden Emergency Rescue/Squad
 Town of Elma Fire Dist. – 
 Blossom V.F.C.
 Elma V.F.C. Inc. (2 Sta.'s)
 Jamison Road V.F.C. Inc.
 Spring Brook V.F.C. Inc.
 Town of Evans Fire Dist. – 
 Angola V.F.D. (2 Sta.'s)
 Evans Center V.F.C. (2 Sta.'s)
 Highland Hose V.F.C. Inc.
 Lake Erie Beach V.F.C. Inc.
 North Evans V.F.C.
 Town of Grand Island Fire Dist. – 
 Grand Island V.F.C. Inc.
 Town of Hamburg Fire Dist. – 
 Armor V.F.C. Inc. 
 Big Tree V.F.C. Inc. (2 Sta.'s)
 Blasdell V.F.D.
 Hamburg V.F.D.
 Lake Shore V.F.C. Inc. (2 Sta.'s)
 Lake View V.F.C. (2 Sta.'s)
 Newton Abbott V.F.C. (2 Sta.'s)
 Scranton V.F.C. Inc. (2 Sta.'s)
 SouthTowns Haz-Mat Team
 Woodlawn V.F.C. Inc.
 Town of Holland Fire Dist. – 
 Holland V.F.D. (2 Sta.'s)
 City of Lackawanna Fire Dist. – 
 Lackawanna F.D. (3 Sta.'s)
 Town of Lancaster Fire Dist. – 
 Bowmansville V.F.C. (2 Sta.'s)
 Lancaster V.F.D. (2 Sta.'s)
 Lancaster Volunteer Ambulance Corps (L.V.A.C.) (2 Sta.'s)
 Town Line V.F.D. Inc. (2 Sta.'s)
 Twin District V.F.C.
 Town of Marilla Fire Dist. – 
 Marilla V.F.C. Inc. 
 Town of Newstead Fire Dist. – 
 Akron V.F.C. Inc. (2 Sta.'s)
 Newstead V.F.C. Inc. (2 Sta.'s)
 Town of North Collins Fire Dist. – 
 Langford New Oregon V.F.C.
 Lawtons V.F.C. Inc.
 North Collins V.F.C. Inc.
 North Collins Emergency Squad Inc.
 Town of Orchard Park Fire Dist. – 
 Hillcrest V.F.C.
 Orchard Park V.F.C. (2 Sta.'s)
 Windom V.F.C.
 Town of Sardinia Fire Dist. – 
 Chaffee Sardinia V.F.C. Inc. (3 Sta.'s)
 City of Tonawanda Fire Dist. – 
 Tonawanda F.D. (2 Sta.'s)
 Town of Tonawanda Fire Dist. – 
 1 – Ellwood V.F.C. #1
 2 – Kenilworth V.F.C. #1
 3 – River Road V.F.C. Inc. #3
 4 – Sheridan Park V.F.C. #4 (2 Sta.'s)
 5 – Brighton V.F.C. #5 (3 Sta.'s)
 Kenmore V.F.D.
 Town of Wales Fire Dist. – 
 1 – South Wales V.F.C. #1
 2 – Wales Center V.F.C.
 Town of West Seneca Fire Dist. – 
 1 – Winchester V.F.C. #1
 2 – Union V.F.C. #2
 3 – Reserve Hose Fire Co. (2 Sta.'s)
 4 – East Seneca V.F.C. #4
 5 – Seneca Hose Co. #1
 6 – Vigilant V.F.C. #1

Essex County
 11 – Au Sable Forks V.F.D.
 13 – Chilson V.F.D.
 14 – Crown Point V.F.D. (2 Sta.'s)
 15 – Elizabethtown V.F.D.
 16 – Essex V.F.D.
 17 – Jay V.F.D.
 18 – Keene V.F.D.
 19 – Keene Valley Hose & Ladder Co. #1
 20 – Bloomingdale V.F.C.
 21 – Lewis V.F.C.
 22 – Lake Placid V.F.D.
 23 – Keeseville V.F.D. (Clinton Co.)
 24 – Mineville Witherbee V.F.D.
 25 – Moriah V.F.D.
 26 – Newcomb V.F.C.
 27 – North Hudson V.F.C.
 28 – Newcomb Rescue Squad
 29 – Port Henry V.F.D.
 32 – Schroon Lake V.F.D.
 33 – Ticonderoga V.F.C. #1
 34 – Upper Jay V.F.D.
 35 – Westport Hose Co. #1
 36 – Wadhams V.F.C. Inc.
 37 – Whallonsburg V.F.D. Inc.
 38 – Willsboro Reber V.F.D. (2 Sta.'s)
 39 – Wilmington V.F.D.
 41 – Au Sable Forks Vol. Amb. Service
 42 – Elizabethtown Lewis Emergency Squad
 43 – Moriah Ambulance Squad Inc.
 44 – Ticonderoga Emergency Squad
 45 - Lamoille Ambulance Service (Crown Point)
 46 – Lake Placid Vol. Amb. Service (L.P.V.A.S.)
 48 – Willsboro-Essex E.M.S.
 49 – County of Essex EMS
 HealthNet 5 - Elizabethtown Community Hospital Transport Ambulance

Franklin County
 10 – Bangor Vol. Fire & E.M.S.
 20 – Bombay V.F.D.
 30 – Brushton V.F.D.
 40 – Burke V.F.D.
 50 – Chateaugay V.F.D.
 60 – Constable V.F.D. (2 Sta.'s)
 70 – Dickinson V.F.D.
 80 – Ft. Covington V.F.D. & E.M.S.
 90 – Hogansburg Akwesasne V.F.D. (3 Sta.'s)
 100 – Malone CallFiremen
 120 – Moira Vol. Fire & Rescue Dept.
 130 – Owls Head Mountain View V.F.D. (2 Sta.'s)
 140 – Saranac Lake V.F.D.
 150 – St. Regis Falls V.F.D.
 160 – Tupper Lake V.F.D. 
 170 – Westville V.F.D.
 180 – Duane V.F.D.
 200 – Bloomingdale V.F.D
 Akwesasne Mohawk Council Ambulance
 Northern Ambulance (Malone, NY)
 Saranac Lake Vol. Rescue/Squad
 Tupper Lake Vol. Amb. & Emer. Squad Inc.

Fulton County
 01 – Berkshire V.F.D. (2 Sta.'s)
 02 – Broadalbin Kennyetto V.F.C. 
 03 – Caroga Lake V.F.C. Inc.
 04 – Ephratah V.F.D.
 05 – Gloversville F.D.
 06 – Hilltop V.F.C.
 07 – Johnstown F.D.
 08 – Mayfield V.F.D.
 09 – Meco V.F.C.
 10 – Northville V.F.D.
 11 – Oppenheim V.F.C. Inc. #1
 12 – Perth V.F.C. Inc.
 13 – Pleasant Square V.F.D.
 14 – Rockwood Garoga Lassellsville V.F.C. Inc. (2 Sta.'s)
 15 – Sammonsville V.F.D.
 16 – Sir William Johnson V.F.C.
 17 – Stratford V.F.C. Inc.
 18 – Fulton Co. Fire Coordinators
 19 – None
 20 – Fulton Co. E.M.S. Coordinators
 21 – Ambulance Service of Fulton County Inc. (Gloversville)
 22 – None
 23 – None
 24 – Stratford & Salisbury Volunteer Ambulance Service (S&S) (2 Sta.'s both in Herkimer Co.)
 25 – Johnstown Area Volunteer Ambulance Corps (J.A.V.A.C.)
 26 – None
 27 – St. Johnsville Area Volunteer Ambulance Corps (S.A.V.A.C.) (Montgomery Co.)
 28 – Town of Northampton Ambulance Service (Northville)
 29 – Nathan Littauer Hospital (Gloversville)

Genesee County

Central Battalion
 10 – Alexander V.F.D. Inc.
 20 – City of Batavia F.D.
 25 – Town of Batavia V.F.D. Inc. (2 Sta.'s)
 35 – Bethany V.F.C.
 55 – Elba V.F.D.
 75 – Oakfield V.F.D.

Eastern Battalion
 30 – Bergen V.F.D. & Amb. 
 40 – Byron V.F.D. & Rescue/Squad
 70 – 
 LeRoy V.F.D.
 LeRoy V.A.S. Inc.
 80 – Pavilion V.F.D.
 90 – South Byron V.F.C. Inc.
 95 – Stafford V.F.D.

Western Battalion
 45 – Corfu V.F.D.
 50 – Darien V.F.C. & E.M.S.
 51 – Alabama V.F.C. Inc. (2 Sta.'s)
 56 – East Pembroke V.F.D.
 85 – 
 Indian Falls V.F.D.
 Pembroke V.F.C. Inc.

Greene County

 01 – Ashland V.F.D.
 02 – Athens V.F.D.
 03 – Catskill V.F.C. #3
 04 – Cairo Hose Co.
 05 – Coxsackie Hose Co. (2 Sta.'s)
 06 – H.D. Lane V.F.C. Inc. (Lanesville)
 07 – Earlton V.F.D.
 08 – East Durham V.F.C. Inc. (2 Sta.'s)
 09 – East Jewett V.F.D.
 10 – Freehold V.F.C.
 11 – Greenville V.F.C. (2 Sta.'s)
 12 – Haines Falls V.F.C. Inc.
 13 – Hensonville Hose Co. (2 Sta.'s)
 14 – Hunter V.F.C. #1
 15 – Jewett V.F.D.
 16 – Kiskatom V.F.D.
 17 – Leeds Hose Co. #1
 18 – 
 Lexington V.F.D. (2 Sta.'s)
 Town of Lexington Ambulance
 19 – Medway Grapeville V.F.C. Inc.
 20 – New Baltimore Fire Dist. #1 (2 Sta.'s)
 21 – Oak Hill Durham V.F.C. Inc.
 22 – Palenville V.F.D.
 23 – Prattsville Hose Co.
 24 – Round Top V.F.C. Inc.
 25 – Tannersville Joint Fire District (2 Sta's)
 26 – Windham Hose Co. #1
 27 – West Athens Limestreet V.F.C. Inc. (2 Sta.'s)
 28-49 – None
 50 – Coeymans Hollow Fire Dist. #6 (Albany Co.)
 51 – Tri Village Fire Dist. #33 (Albany Co.)
 52 – None
 53 – Coeymans Fire Dist. #5 (Albany Co.)
 54 – Medusa Fire Dist. #18 (Albany Co.)
 55 – Saxton V.F.C. (Ulster Co.)
 56 – Ravena Hose Co. #8 (Albany Co.)
 57 – Grand Gorge Hose Co. #1 & Rescue/Squad (Delaware Co.)
 58 – Westerlo Fire Dist. #39 (3 Sta.'s) (Albany Co.)
 59-60 – None
 61 – 
 Coxsackie Correctional Facility
 Greene Correctional Facility
 62 – N.Y.S. Forest Rangers
 63-65 – None
 66 – Greene Co. Fire Investigation Team
 67 – Greene Co. Haz/Mat Team
 68 – Greene Co. Emergency Communications
 69 – Twin Cloves Technical Rescue Team (Rope Rescue)
 70 – None
 71 – Town of Ashland Ambulance 
 72 – None
 73 – Town of Catskill Ambulance Service
 74 – Town of Cairo Ambulance
 75 – Town of Coxsackie E.M.S.
 76-80 – None
 81 – Town of Greenville Rescue/Squad
 82-83 – None
 84 – Town of Hunter Area Ambulance
 85-90 – None
 91 – Town of Durham V.A.S. Inc.
 92-95 – None
 96 – Town of Windham Ambulance 
 97 – None
 98 – Greene Co. Paramedics (4 Sta.'s)

Hamilton County
 Blue Mountain Lake V.F.D. (aka Indian Lake Fire Dist. #2)
 Hope V.F.D.
 Indian Lake V.F.C. (aka Indian Lake Fire Dist. #1)
 Indian Lake Volunteer Ambulance Corps
 Inlet Volunteer Emergency Services Inc. (I.V.E.S.)
 Lake Pleasant V.F.D.
 Long Lake V.F.D.
 Long Lake Rescue/Squad
 Morehouse V.F.D.
 Piseco V.F.D. Inc.
 Piseco Volunteer Ambulance Corps
 Raquette Lake V.F.D.
 Speculator V.F.D.
 Speculator Volunteer Ambulance Corps
 Wells V.F.D.
 Wells Volunteer Ambulance Corps

Herkimer County
 Beaver Flow V.F.D. (Private F.D.)
 Big Moose V.F.D. (Town of Webb Fire Dist. #1)
 Cedarville V.F.D. (aka Joseph Berberich Hose Co. Inc.)
 Dolgeville V.F.D.
 Eagle Bay Vol. Hose Co. (Town of Webb Fire Dist. #1)
 East Herkimer V.F.D. (2 Sta.'s)
 Frankfort V.F.D.
 Frankfort Center V.F.D.
 Frankfort Hill V.F.C.
 Gray V.F.C. (disbanded as of 2003)
 Herkimer F.D.
 Ilion F.D.
 Little Falls F.D.
 Middleville V.F.D. (aka E.W. Corey Hose Co.)
 Mohawk V.F.D. (aka German Flatts Fire Dist.)
 Newport V.F.C. #4
 Old Forge V.F.D. (Town of Webb Fire Dist. #1)
 Poland V.F.C. (2 Sta.'s)
 Salisbury V.F.D. (2 Sta.'s)
 Schuyler V.F.C. Inc. (2 Sta.'s)
 Van Hornesville Fire Dist. #1 (2 Sta.'s)
 West Winfield V.F.D. (aka Henry Hiteman Engine & Hose Co.)
 American Medical Response (A.M.R.) (Herkimer, NY)
 Kuyahoora Valley Ambulance Corps (K.V.A.C.) (Poland, NY)
 Mohawk Valley Volunteer Ambulance Corps (M.O.V.A.C.) (Mohawk, NY)
 Stratford & Salisbury Volunteer Ambulance Service (2 Sta.'s)

Jefferson County
 01 – 
 Adams V.F.D. #1
 South Jefferson Rescue Squad Inc.
 02 – Adams Center V.F.D.
 03 – Alexandria Bay V.F.D.
 04 – Antwerp V.F.D.
 05 – Belleville V.F.C. #1 (2 Sta.'s)
 06 – 
 Black River V.F.D.
 Black River Ambulance Squad
 07 – Town of Brownville Joint F.D. (3 Sta.'s)
 08 – Calcium V.F.D. (2 Sta.'s)
 09 – Fort Drum F.D. & Ambulance (3 Sta.'s)
 10 – Cape Vincent V.F.D.
 11 – 
 Carthage V.F.D.
 Carthage Area Rescue/Squad (C.A.R.S.)
 12 – Champion V.F.C. ***(NOW CLOSED)***
 13 – Chaumont V.F.D.
 14 – Clayton V.F.D.
 15 – Deferiet V.F.C.
 16 – DePauville V.F.D.
 17 –
  Dexter V.F.D. (2 Sta.'s) ***(Merged with Brownville V.F.D., Town of Brownville Joint F.D. created)***
 18 – None
 19 – Ellisburg V.F.D.
 20 – Evans Mills V.F.D. & Ambulance Squad
 21 – Felts Mills V.F.C.
 22 – Fishers Landing V.F.D.
 23 – Glen Park V.F.D.
 24 – Great Bend V.F.D.
 25 – Henderson V.F.D. & Ambulance
 26 – 
 Herrings V.F.D. ***(NOW CLOSED)***
 Indian River Ambulance Service
 27 – LaFargeville V.F.D. (2 Sta.'s)
 28 – Lorraine V.F.C.
 29 – Mannsville Manor V.F.C. Inc.
 30 – None
 31 – Natural Bridge V.F.C. & Ambulance Service
 32 – Northpole V.F.C. Inc.
 33 – Oxbow V.F.D.
 34 – Pamelia V.F.D.
 35 – Philadelphia V.F.D.
 36 – Plessis V.F.D.
 37 – Redwood V.F.D.
 38 – Rodman V.F.D.
 39 – Rutland V.F.D. (2 Sta.'s)
 40 – Sackets Harbor V.F.C. (2 Sta.'s)
 41 – Smithville V.F.D.
 42 – Theresa V.F.D. Inc.
 43 – Thousand Island Emergency Rescue Services (T.I.E.R.S.)
 44 – Three Mile Bay V.F.C. Inc.
 45 – Tylerville V.F.C. (Dept. disbanded & now Rutland V.F.D. Sta. #2)
 46 – 
 Town of Watertown V.F.D. (3 Sta.'s)
 Town of Watertown Ambulance Service (T.W.A.S.) (2 Sta.'s)
 47 – City of Watertown F.D. (3 Sta.'s)
 48 – Wellesley Island V.F.D. (2 Sta.'s)
 49 – West Carthage V.F.D.
 50 – Worth V.F.D. ***(NOW CLOSED)***
 55 – Copenhagen V.F.D. (Lewis Co.)
 56 – Special Tactics & Rescue Team (S.T.A.R.)
 57 – Hazardous Materials Response Team
 Watertown International Airport F.D.
 Guilfoyle Ambulance Service

Lewis County
 10 – Beaver Falls V.F.D.
 12 – Castorland V.F.C.
 14 – Copenhagen V.F.D. Inc.
 16 – Croghan V.F.D.
 18 – Harrisville V.F.D. Inc.
 20 – 3G V.F.C. Inc. (aka Glenfield V.F.D.) (2 Sta.'s)
 22/24 – Lowville V.F.D.
 26 – Martinsburg V.F.D.
 28 – New Bremen V.F.C. Inc.
 30 – Constableville V.F.C. Inc.
 32 – Lyons Falls V.F.D. 
 34 – J.S. Koster Hose Co. Inc. (Port Leyden, NY)
 36 – Turin V.F.C. Inc.
 95 – West Leyden V.F.D.
 Lewis County Search & Rescue (Ambulance Service)

Livingston County

 11 – Caledonia V.F.D.
 12 – Genesee Valley E.M.S. (aka Caledonia Ambulance)
 13 – Leicester V.F.D.
 14 – None
 15 – York E.M.S.
 16 – Cuylerville V.F.D. & Amb.
 17 – York V.F.D. Inc. (2 Sta.'s)
 18 – None
 19 – None
 20 – None
 21 – Lakeville V.F.D.
 22 – Avon V.F.D.
 23 – Lima V.F.D.
 24 – Avon Rotary Lions Ambulance
 25 – Livonia V.F.D.
 26 – Hemlock V.F.D.
 27 – East Avon V.F.D. (2 Sta.'s)
 28 – Lima Volunteer Ambulance
 29 – Livonia E.M.S.
 30 – None
 31 – Geneseo V.F.D.
 32 – Groveland V.F.D.
 33 – S.U.N.Y. Geneseo First Response
 34 – Conesus V.F.D.
 35 to 40 – None
 41 – Mount Morris V.F.D.
 42 – Nunda V.F.D. & Vol. Amb. Service
 43 – Mount Morris E.M.S.
 44 to 50 – None
 51 – Dansville V.F.D.
 52 – Dansville Ambulance Co.
 53 – None
 54 – Springwater V.F.D. Inc.
 55 – Sparta Center V.F.C.
 56 – Ossian V.F.D. (disbanded)
 57 – None
 58 – West Sparta V.F.D.
 59 – None
 60 – None
 61 – None
 62 – Livingston Co. Emergency Management & Fire Training Center

Madison County
 07 – Bridgeport V.F.C. (2 Sta.'s)
 11 – Brookfield V.F.D.
 12 – Canastota V.F.D.
 13 – Cazenovia V.F.D.
 14 – Tioughnioga V.F.D. (DeRuyter, NY)
 15 – Earlville V.F.C. (2 Sta.'s)
 16 – Eaton Fire Dist. #1 (2 Sta.'s)
 17 – Erieville V.F.D.
 18 – Georgetown V.F.D.
 19 – Hamilton V.F.D.
 20 – Hubbardsville V.F.D.
 21 – Leonardsville V.F.D.
 22 – Lincoln V.F.D. (2 Sta.'s)
 23 – Madison V.F.D.
 24 – Morrisville V.F.D.
 25 – Munnsville V.F.D.
 26 – New Woodstock V.F.D.
 27 – Madison Co. Fire Control
 28 – North Brookfield V.F.D.
 29 – Oneida City F.D.
 31 – Smithfield V.F.D.
 32 – Wampsville V.F.D.
 33 – West Eaton V.F.D. (Now part of the Eaton Fire Dist. #1)
 34 – Poolville V.F.D. (Dept. has disbanded and is now covered by Earlville V.F.C.)
 41 – Greater Lenox Ambulance Service (G.L.A.S.)
 51 – Southern Madison Co. Ambulance Corps (S.O.M.A.C.)
 66 – North Chittenango V.F.C.
 68 – Chittenango V.F.C.
 71 – Smithfield Eaton Volunteer Ambulance Corps (S.E.V.A.C.)
 81 – Cazenovia Area Volunteer Ambulance Corps (C.A.V.A.C.)
 American Medical Response (A.M.R.) (Town of Sullivan, NY)
 Smith Ambulance (DeRuyter, NY)
 Vineall Ambulance (Oneida, NY)

Monroe County

 Rochester City F.D. (17 Sta.'s)

Battalion #1
 10 – Webster V.F.D. (aka North East Joint Fire Dist. – 3 Sta.'s)
 11 – Point Pleasant V.F.D. (2 Sta.'s)
 12 – West Webster V.F.D. (3 Sta.'s)
 13 – None
 14 – None
 15 – St. Paul Blvd. V.F.D. 
 16 – Laurelton V.F.D.
 17 – North East Quadrant/Webster EMS
 18 – 
 Ridge Culver V.F.D.
 Irondequoit V.A.S.
 19 – Sea Breeze V.F.A. Inc.

Battalion #2
 20 – Lake Shore V.F.D. (3 Sta.'s)
 21 – Morton V.F.C. Inc.
 22 – Barnard V.F.D.
 23 – 
 Brockport V.F.D. (5 Sta.'s)
 Brockport V.A.C.
 Holley V.F.D. (Orleans Co.)
 Holley Vol. Amb. (Orleans Co.)
 24 – 
 Hamlin V.F.D.
 Hamlin V.A.C.
 25 – Greece Ridge V.F.D. (aka Ridge Road Fire Dist. – 3 Sta.'s)
 26 – Hilton Parma V.F.D.
 27 – 
 North Greece V.F.D. (3 Sta.'s)
 Greece V.A.S. Inc.
 28 – Walker V.F.D.
 29 – Spencerport V.F.D. (3 Sta.'s)

Battalion #3
 30 – 
 Brighton V.F.D. (3 Sta.'s)
 Brighton Vol. Amb.
 31 – Bushnell's Basin V.F.D. (2 Sta.'s)
 32 – 
 East Rochester V.F.D.
 East Rochester V.A.C.
 33 – 
 Egypt V.F.D. (2 Sta.'s)
 Victor Farmington Vol. Amb. (2 Sta.'s – Ontario Co.)
 34 – 
 Fairport V.F.D. (2 Sta.'s)
 Perinton V.A.C.
 35 – Fishers V.F.D. (2 Sta.'s – Ontario Co.)
 36 – Mendon V.F.D.
 37 – 
 Penfield V.F.D. (3 Sta.'s)
 Penfield Vol. Emer. Amb.
 38 – 
 Pittsford V.F.D. (2 Sta.'s)
 Pittsford Vol. Amb. 
 39 – None

Battalion #4
 40 – None
 41 – None
 42 – 
 Churchville V.F.D.
 Bergen V.F.D. & Amb. (Genesee Co.)
 43 – 
 Chili V.F.D. (4 Sta.'s)
 Chili V.A.S. **(member of CHS Mobile Integrated Healthcare)**
 44 – Clifton V.F.D.
 45 – 
 Gates V.F.D. (3 Sta.'s)
 Gates V.A.S. Inc.
 46 – Scottsville V.F.D. & Rescue/Squad **(member of CHS Mobile Integrated Healthcare)**
 47 – 
 Mumford V.F.D.
 Caledonia V.F.D. (Livingston Co.)
 Genesee Valley E.M.S. (aka Caledonia Amb. – Livingston Co.) ***(officially disbanded)*** **(services now provided by CHS Mobile Integrated Healthcare)**
 48 – None
 49 – None

Battalion #5
 50 – West Brighton V.F.D (2 Sta.'s) ***(disbanded)***
 51 – None
 52 – None
 53 – None
 54 – None
 55 – None
 56 – 
 Honeoye Falls V.F.D.
 Honeoye Falls-Mendon Vol. Amb. Inc.
 Lima V.F.D. (Livingston Co.)
 Lima Vol. Amb. (Livingston Co.)
 57 – None
 58 – 
 Rush V.F.D. (2 Sta.'s)
 Avon V.F.D. (Livingston Co.)
 Avon Rotary Lions Amb. (Livingston Co.)
 59 – None
 06 – Henrietta V.F.D. (6 Sta.'s)
 60 – None
 61 – Henrietta V.A.S. Inc. **(now CHS Mobile Integrated Healthcare)** 
 62 – None
 63 – Rochester Institute of Technology (R.I.T.) Amb. 
 64 thru 69 – None

Battalion #7
 70 – Kodak F.D.
 71 – Xerox F.D.

Montgomery County
 American Medical Response (A.M.R.) (Nelliston)
 32 – Greater Amsterdam Volunteer Ambulance Corps (G.A.V.A.C.)
 33 – Mid County Volunteer Ambulance (disbanded)
 34 – Fonda Fultonville Area Volunteer Ambulance (disbanded)
 35 – St. Johnsville Volunteer Ambulance Corps Inc. (S.A.V.A.C.) (disbanded)
 206 – Ames V.F.D.
 207 – City of Amsterdam F.D.
 208 – Burtonsville V.F.C. Inc.
 209 – Canajoharie V.F.D.
 210 – Charleston V.F.D.
 211 – Cranesville V.F.D.
 212 – Fonda V.F.D. – The Fonda Fire Department was dissolved by Mayor Bill Peeler and the Village Board effective March 14, 2013.
 213 – Fort Hunter Engine & Hose Co. Inc.
 214 – Fort Johnson V.F.C. (2 Sta.'s)
 215 – Fort Plain V.F.D.
 216 – Fultonville V.F.D. (aka Aetna Engine Co. #1)
 217 – Town of Glen V.F.D. Inc.
 218 – Hagaman V.F.D.
 219 – Rural Grove V.F.C.
 220 – St. Johnsville V.F.D. (2 Sta.'s)
 221 – Town of Florida V.F.D. (2 Sta.'s)
 222 – Town of Mohawk V.F.D.
 223 – Tribes Hill V.F.D. Inc.
 224 – South Minden V.F.D.

Nassau County

1st Battalion
 100 – Bellerose Village V.F.D.
 110 – Bellerose Terrace V.F.D.
 120 – Floral Park V.F.D. (3 Sta.'s)
 130 – Floral Park Centre V.F.C. Inc. 
 140 – Garden City V.F.D. (3 Sta.'s)
 150 – Garden City Park V.F.D. (2 Sta.'s)
 160 – Mineola V.F.D. (3 Sta.'s)
 170 – New Hyde Park V.F.D. (4 Sta.'s)
 180 – South Floral Park V.F.D.
 190 – Stewart Manor V.F.D.
260 – Mineola V.A.C.

2nd Battalion
 200 – Baldwin V.F.D. (4 Sta.'s)
 210 – Freeport V.F.D. (6 Sta.'s)
 220 – Island Park V.F.D.
 230 – Long Beach V.F.D. (3 Sta.'s)
 240 – Oceanside V.F.D. (6 Sta.'s)
 250 – Pt. Lookout-Lido V.F.D. (3 Sta.'s)
 270 – Malverne V.A.C.
 280 – Bellmore Merrick E.M.S. (2 Sta.'s)
 290 – Wantagh Levittown V.A.C.

3rd Battalion
 300 – Hewlett V.F.D.
 310 – Inwood V.F.D.
 320 – Lawrence Cedarhurst V.F.D.
 330 – Meadowmere Park V.F.D.
 340 – Valley Stream V.F.D. (5 Sta.'s)
 350 – Woodmere V.F.D. 
 360 – Atlantic Beach Rescue/Squad

4th Battalion
 400 – East Rockaway V.F.D. (4 Sta.'s)
 410 – Lakeview V.F.D. 
 420 – Lynbrook V.F.D. (6 Sta.'s)
 430 – Malverne V.F.D. 
 440 – Rockville Centre V.F.D. (5 Sta.'s)

5th Battalion
 500 – Bayville V.F.C. #1
 510 – East Norwich V.F.C. #1
 520 – 
 Glen Cove V.F.D.
 Glen Cove Volunteer E.M.S.
 530 – Glenwood Hook & Ladder, Engine & Hose Fire Co. (2 Sta.'s)
 540 – Locust Valley V.F.D.
 550 – 
 Oyster Bay Fire Co. #1
 Atlantic Steamer Fire Co. #1 (2 Sta.'s)
 560 – Roslyn Rescue Hook & Ladder Co. #1 (3 Sta.'s)
 570 – Sea Cliff Engine & Hose Co.
 580 – Syosset V.F.D. (3 Sta.'s)
 590 – Roslyn Highlands Hook & Ladder, Engine & Hose Co. (2 Sta.'s)

6th Battalion
 600 – Bellmore V.F.D. (3 Sta.'s)
 610 – East Meadow V.F.D. (5 Sta.'s)
 620 – Levittown V.F.D. (3 Sta.'s)
 630 – Massapequa V.F.D. (4 Sta.'s)
 640 – Merrick V.F.D. (3 Sta.'s)
 650 – North Bellmore V.F.D. (3 Sta.'s)
 660 – North Massapequa V.F.D. (2 Sta.'s)
 670 – North Merrick V.F.D. 
 680 – Seaford V.F.D. 
 690 – Wantagh Hook, Ladder & Engine Co. #1 (7 Sta.'s)

7th Battalion
 700 – Elmont V.F.D. (8 Sta.'s)
 710 – Franklin Square & Munson V.F.D.
 720 – Hempstead V.F.D. (6 Sta.'s)
 730 – Roosevelt V.F.D. (3 Sta.'s)
 740 – South Hempstead V.F.D.
 750 – Uniondale V.F.D. (3 Sta.'s)
 760 – West Hempstead V.F.D.

8th Battalion
 800 – Albertson Hook & Ladder, Engine & Hose Co. #1 (2 Sta.'s)
 810 – East Williston V.F.D. 
 820 – Alert Engine, Hook, Ladder & Hose Co. #1 (2 Sta.'s)
 830 – Vigilant Engine & Hook & Ladder Co. 
 840 – Plandome V.F.D.
 850 – Pt. Washington V.F.D. (5 Sta.'s)
 860 – 
 Williston Park V.F.D.
 Williston Park Ambulance
 870 – Manhasset-Lakeville V.F.D. (6 Sta.'s)

9th Battalion
 900 – Bethpage V.F.D. (3 Sta.'s)
 910 – Carle Place Hook, Ladder & Hose Co. #1 
 920 – Farmingdale Hook, Ladder & Hose Co. #1/Water Witch Engine & Hose Co. #1
 930 – Hicksville V.F.D. (4 Sta.'s)
 940 – Jericho V.F.D. (3 Sta.'s)
 950 – Plainview V.F.D. (3 Sta.'s)
 960 – Westbury V.F.D. (2 Sta.'s)
 970 – South Farmingdale V.F.D. (2 Sta.'s)

Ambulance & Other Dept.'s
 C.W. Post New York Tech Ambulance (Greenvale)
 First Response Ambulance (Inwood)
 Hatzalah of the Rockaways & Nassau Co. (Woodmere)
 Mitchell Field A.F.B. F.D. (Uniondale)
 North Shore Univ. Hosp. Ambulance (Syosset)
 U.S. Merchant Marine Academy E.M.S. (Kings Point)
 NYU Langone Hospitals EMS – Nassau Division (Garden City)
 Town of Hempstead EMS (Point Lookout) – Municipal ALS-FR

Niagara County
 01 – Adams V.F.C. (2 Sta.'s)
 02 – Barker V.F.D. Inc.
 03 – Bergholz V.F.C. 
 04 – Cambria V.F.C. Inc. (2 Sta.'s)
 05 – Frontier V.F.C. Inc. (2 Sta.'s)
 06 – Gasport Chemical Hose Co. Inc. (2 Sta.'s)
 07 – Lewiston V.F.C. #1 Inc. (2 Sta.'s)
 08 – Lewiston V.F.C. #2 Inc.
 09 – Lockport F.D.
 10 – Middleport V.F.C. #1
 11 – Miller Hose Fire Co.
 12 – Town of Niagara Active Hose Co. Inc.
 13 – None
 14 – Niagara Falls F.D. (6 Sta.'s)
 15 – North Tonawanda F.D. (8 Sta.'s)
 16 – Olcott V.F.C.
 17 – Pekin V.F.C. Inc.
 18 – Ransomville V.F.C.
 19 – Rapids V.F.C. Inc. (2 Sta.'s)
 20 – St. Johnsburg V.F.C. Inc.
 21 – Sanborn V.F.C. Inc. 
 22 – Shawnee V.F.C. Inc. (2 Sta.'s)
 23 – South Lockport V.F.C. Inc. (2 Sta.'s)
 24 – South Wilson V.F.C. Inc.
 25 – Terry's Corners V.F.C.
 26 – Upper Mountain V.F.C.
 27 – Wendelville V.F.C. Inc. (3 Sta.'s)
 28 – Wilson V.F.C. #1 (2 Sta.'s)
 29 – Wolcottsville V.F.C. Inc.
 30 – Wrights Corners V.F.C. Inc. (3 Sta.'s)
 31 – Youngstown V.F.C. Inc.
 32 – County Coordinators
 33 – Hartland V.F.C. Inc.
 34 – None
 35 – None
 36 – None
 37 – Niagara Falls Air Reserve Station F.D.
 American Medical Response (A.M.R.-Niagara Falls)
 Mercy Flight E.M.S. (Town of Niagara and east side of the county)
 Tri-Community Ambulance Service Inc. (Sanborn)
 Tri-Town Ambulance Inc. (3 Sta.'s)
 Twin City Ambulance (Covers N.T. and has a station in City of Lockport. Erie Co.-2 Sta.'s)

Oneida County
 10 – New Hartford V.F.D.
 11 – New York Mills V.F.D.
 12 – Yorkville Fire & Hose Co.
 13 – Whitesboro V.F.D.
 14 – Oriskany V.F.D.
 15 – Maynard V.F.D. (2 Sta.'s)
 16 – Oneida County Airport F.D.
 17 – Clark Mills V.F.D.
 20 – Utica F.D. (6 Sta.'s)
 24 – Edwards Ambulance (Chadwicks, NY)
 27 – Oneida County Fire Control 
 28 – Emergency Services Coordinators
 30 – Willowvale Fire Co. Inc.
 31 – Sauquoit Fire Dist. #1
 32 – Paris Hill V.F.C.
 33 – Clayville V.F.D.
 34 – Cassville V.F.D.
 35 – Bridgewater V.F.C.
 36 – Henry Hiteman Engine & Hose Co. (West Winfield, NY – Herkimer Co.)
 37 – Unadilla Forks V.F.C. (Otsego Co.)
 40 – Clinton V.F.D. (2 Sta.'s)
 41 – Barton Hose Co. (Deansboro, NY)
 42 – Waterville V.F.D.
 43 – Oriskany Falls V.F.D. (2 Sta.'s)
 44 – Westmoreland V.F.D.
 45 – Lairdsville V.F.D. (disbanded)
 46 – Lowell V.F.D. (disbanded)
 50 – Volunteer Fire Co. of Vernon Inc.
 51 – Sherrill-Kenwood V.F.D.
 52 – Oneida Castle V.F.D.
 54 – Durhamville V.F.D.
 55 – Verona V.F.D. (2 Sta.'s)
 56 – Vernon Center V.F.D.
 60 – Rome F.D. (2 Sta.'s)
 62 – Stanwix Heights V.F.D.
 63 – New London V.F.D.
 64 – Town of Lee Fire Dist. (aka Lee Center V.F.D.)
 65 – Volunteer Fire Co. of Western Inc.
 66 – Lake Delta V.F.D.
 67 – Portners V.F.C. (Lee Center, NY) (disbanded)
 68 – Rome State School F.D. (disbanded)
 69 – Vineall Ambulance (1 Sta. in Oneida, NY (Madison Co.) & 1 at the Sylvan Beach V.F.D.)
 70 – Sylvan Beach V.F.D.
 71 – McConnellsville V.F.D. 
 72 – North Bay V.F.D.
 73 – Taberg V.F.C.
 74 – Camden V.F.D.
 75 – Vienna V.F.D.
 76 – Blossvale V.F.D. (disbanded)
 77 – Cleveland V.F.D. (Oswego Co.)
 78 – Florence V.F.D.
 80 – Deerfield V.F.C. #1 (2 Sta.'s)
 81 – Floyd V.F.D.
 82 – Stittville V.F.D.
 83 – Holland Patent Hose Co.
 84 – Barneveld V.F.D.
 85 – Prospect V.F.C. Inc. (disbanded)
 86 – Poland V.F.D. (2 Sta.'s both in Herkimer Co.)
 90 – Remsen V.F.C. Inc. 
 91 – Boonville V.F.C. Inc. & Ambulance
 92 – Forestport Fire Fighters Inc.
 93 – Otter Lake V.F.D.
 94 – Old Forge V.F.D. (Herkimer Co.)
 95 – West Leyden V.F.D. (Lewis Co.)
 97 – Woodgate V.F.D.
 AmCare Ambulance (Rome, NY)
 Central Oneida County Volunteer Ambulance Corps (C.O.C.V.A.C.) (headquarters is in Clark Mills, Sta. #2 is in Whitesboro, NY & Sta. #3 is in Waterville, NY) 
 Kunkel Ambulance (Utica, NY)

Onondaga County
 01 – Amber V.F.D.
 02 – Apulia V.F.D.
 03 – Baldwinsville V.F.D. (3 Sta.'s)
 04 – Belgium Cold Springs V.F.D. (2 Sta.'s)
 05 – Borodino V.F.D.
 07 – Bridgeport V.F.D. (2 Sta.'s & both in Madison Co.)
 08 – Camillus V.F.D.
 09 – Brewerton V.F.D. (2 Sta.'s)
 10 – Cicero V.F.D. (2 Sta.'s)
 11 – Clay V.F.D. (2 Sta.'s)
 13 – Delphi Falls V.F.D.
 14 – DeWitt V.F.D.
 15 – East Syracuse V.F.D. (2 Sta.'s)
 17 – Elbridge V.F.D.
 18 – Fabius V.F.D.
 19 – Fairmount V.F.D.
 20 – Fayetteville V.F.D.
 21 – Hinsdale V.F.D.
 22 – Howlett Hill V.F.D.
 23 – Jamesville V.F.D.
 24 – Jordan V.F.D.
 25 – Kirkville V.F.C.
 26 – Lafayette V.F.D. (2 Sta.'s)
 27 – Lakeside V.F.D. (2 Sta.'s)
 28 – Liverpool V.F.D. (3 Sta.'s)
 30 – Lyncourt V.F.D.
 31 – Lysander V.F.D. (2 Sta.'s)
 32 – Manlius V.F.D.
 33 – Marcellus V.F.D.
 35 – Mattydale V.F.D.
 36 – Memphis V.F.D.
 37 – Minoa V.F.D. (2 Sta.'s)
 38 – Mottville V.F.C.
 39 – Moyers Corners V.F.D. (4 Sta.'s)
 41 – Navarino V.F.D.
 42 – Nedrow V.F.D.
 43 – North Syracuse V.F.D. (2 Sta.'s)
 44 – Onondaga Hill V.F.D.
 45 – Onondaga Nation V.F.D.
 46 – Otisco V.F.D.
 47 – Enterprise Fire Co. #1 (Phoenix, NY) (3 Sta.'s 2 of which are in Oswego Co.)
 48 – Plainville V.F.D.
 51 – Pompey Hill V.F.D.
 52 – Seneca River V.F.D.
 53 – Sentinel Heights V.F.D.
 54 – Skaneateles V.F.D. (3 Sta.'s)
 57 – Solvay V.F.D. (3 Sta.'s)
 58 – South Bay V.F.D.
 59 – South Onondaga V.F.D.
 60 – Southwood V.F.D.
 61 – Spafford V.F.D.
 62 – Taunton V.F.D. (2 Sta.'s)
 63 – Tully Hose Co.
 65 – Warners V.F.D.
 66 – North Chittenango V.F.C. (Madison Co.)
 68 – Chittenango V.F.D. (Madison Co.)
 71 – Caughdenoy V.F.D. (2 Sta.'s) (Oswego Co.)
 72 – Cody V.F.D. (2 Sta.'s) (Oswego Co.)
 80 – East Area Volunteer Emergency Services (E.A.V.E.S.)
 81 – Greater Baldwinsville Ambulance Corps (G.B.A.C.)
 82 – North Area Volunteer Ambulance Corps (N.A.V.A.C.)
 83 – Skaneateles Ambulance Volunteer Emergency Services (S.A.V.E.S.)
 87 – Western Area Volunteer Emergency Services (W.A.V.E.S.)
 88 – American Medical Response (A.M.R.)
 89 – Northern Onondaga Volunteer Ambulance (N.O.V.A.)
 98 – Syracuse Airport Aircraft Rescue Fire Fighting (A.R.F.F.)
 99 – Syracuse F.D. (11 Sta.'s)

Ontario County

 01 – Bristol V.F.D. (2 Sta.'s)
 02 – Canandaigua F.D. (2 Sta.'s)
 03 – Canandaigua Veterans Administration Hospital F.D.
 04 – Cheshire V.F.D. (2 Sta.'s)
 05 – Clifton Springs V.F.D.
 06 – Crystal Beach V.F.D. Inc.
 07 – East Bloomfield Holcomb V.F.D.
 08 – Farmington Volunteer Fire Assn. (2 Sta.'s)
 09 – Fishers V.F.D. (2 Sta.'s)
 10 – None
 11 – Geneva F.D. (2 Sta.'s)
 12 – Gorham V.F.D.
 13 – Hall V.F.D.
 14 – Richmond V.F.D.
 15 – Hopewell V.F.D. Inc. (2 Sta.'s)
 16 – Ionia V.F.C.
 17 – Manchester V.F.D.
 18 – Maxfield Hose Co. Inc. (3 Sta.'s)
 19 – North Side V.F.C.
 20 – None
 21 – Phelps V.F.D.
 22 – Port Gibson V.F.D. Inc.
 23 – Rushville Hose Co. 
 24 – Seneca Castle V.F.C.
 25 – Citizens Hose Co. (Shortsville, NY)
 26 – Stanley V.F.D.
 27 – Victor V.F.D.
 28 – West Bloomfield V.F.D. Inc.
 29 – West Lake Road Fire Assn. Inc.
 30 – None
 31 – White Springs Fire Assn.
 32 – Oaks Corners V.F.C. Inc.
 33 – Victor Farmington Volunteer Ambulance (2 Sta.'s)
 34 – Canandaigua Emergency Squad
 35 – None
 36 – Naples Ambulance Inc.
 37 – Phelps Ambulance
 Finger Lakes Ambulance (2 Sta.'s – Clifton Springs, NY)

Orange County

Battalion 1
 05 – Circleville V.F.D. (2 Sta.'s)
 15 – Otisville Mount Hope V.A.C.
 21 – Howells V.F.C. #1
 26 – Middletown V.F.D. (3 Sta.'s)
 27 – Mechanicstown V.F.D. (2 Sta.'s)
 34 – Otisville V.F.D.
 37 – Pocatello Mount Hope V.F.C.
 42 – Silver Lake V.F.C.
 48 – Washington Heights V.F.C.

Battalion 2
 06 – Coldenham V.F.C.
 24 – Maybrook Engine Co. #1
 29 – Montgomery V.F.D.
 35 – Pine Bush Hook & Ladder Co. #1
 46 – Walden V.F.D. (2 Sta.'s)
 57 – Bullville V.F.C.

Battalion 3
 09 – Cronomer Valley V.F.D.
 11 – Dan Leghorn Engine Co. #1 (Newburgh)
 14 – Good Will V.F.D. Inc. (Newburgh)
 25 – Middlehope V.F.D. (2 Sta.'s)
 31 – Newburgh F.D. (2 Sta.'s)
 50 – Winona Lake Engine Co. #2 (Newburgh)
 54 – Stewart Air National Guard F.D.

Battalion 4
 07 – Cornwall V.F.D. (2 Sta.'s)
 08 – Storm King Engine Co. #2 (Cornwall-On-Hudson)
 13 – Ft. Montgomery V.F.D.
 19 – Highland Falls V.F.D.
 33 – Quassaick Engine Co. (New Windsor)
 45 – Vails Gate V.F.C. (2 Sta.'s)
 55 – West Point F.D. (3 Sta.'s)

Battalion 5
 28 – Monroe Joint Fire Dist. (3 Fire Co.'s & 4 Sta.'s)
 39 – Salisbury Mills V.F.D. (2 Sta.'s)
 43 – Tuxedo Joint V.F.D. (3 Sta.'s)
 49 – Monell Engine Co. (Washingtonville)
 51 – Woodbury V.F.D. (2 Sta.'s)
 58 – South Blooming Grove V.F.D. 
 59 – Kiryas Joel V.F.D.

Battalion 6
 01 – Pine Island V.F.D. (2 Sta.'s)
 12 – Highland Engine & Hook Co. #3 (Florida)
 17 – Greenwood Lake V.F.D.
 47 – Warwick V.F.D. (3 Sta.'s)

Battalion 7
 15 – Mountain View V.F.D. (Formerly Greenville Twp. V.F.D. Inc.)
 22 – Rutgers Engine Co. #1 (aka Johnson V.F.D.)
 32 – New Hampton V.F.C.
 40 – Wawayanda V.F.C.
 44 – Minisink Hose Co. #1 (Unionville)

Battalion 8
 10 – Cuddebackville Fire Dist. #1
 38 – Port Jervis V.F.D. (5 Sta.'s)
 41 – Sparrowbush Engine Co. Inc. (2 Sta.'s)
 52 – Huguenot V.F.C. Inc.

Battalion 9
 02 – Otterkill Engine Co. #1 (Campbell Hall)
 04 – Chester V.F.D. (3 Sta.'s)
 16 – Goshen V.F.D. (3 Sta.'s)

Orleans County

East Battalion
 Clarendon V.F.C.
 F.H.M. (Fancher Hulberton Murray) V.F.C.
 Holley V.F.D.
 Kendall V.F.D.
 Morton V.F.C. Inc. (Monroe Co.)

Central Battalion
 Albion V.F.D. Inc.
 Barre V.F.C. Inc. 
 Carlton V.F.C. (2 Sta.'s)

West Battalion
 East Shelby V.F.C. Inc.
 Lyndonville V.F.C.
 Medina F.D.
 Ridgeway V.F.C. Inc. (2 Sta.'s)
 Shelby V.F.C. Inc. (2 Sta.'s)

Ambulance Services
 C.O.V.A. (Central Orleans Vol. Amb.)

Oswego County
 01 – Alcan Aluminum Fire Brigade (Novelis)
 02 – Altmar V.F.D.
 03 – Fulton F.D. (2 Sta.'s)
 04 – Cleveland V.F.D.
 05 – Central Square Fire Co. #1
 06 – Caughdenoy V.F.D. (2 Sta.'s)
 07 – Cody V.F.D. (2 Sta.'s)
 08 – Constantia Fire Dist. #1
 09 – Brewerton V.F.D. (2 Sta.'s) (Onondaga Co.)
 10 – Granby Center V.F.D.
 11 – Hastings V.F.D.
 12 – Hannibal V.F.C.
 13 – Lacona V.F.D.
 14 – Mexico V.F.D.
 15 – Minetto V.F.D.
 16 – New Haven V.F.C.
 17 – Orwell V.F.C.
 18 – Oswego City F.D. (2 Sta.'s)
 19 – Palermo V.F.C.
 20 – Parish V.F.C.
 21 – Pennellville V.F.D.
 23 – Ringgold Fire Co. #1 (Pulaski, NY)
 24 – Redfield V.F.C.
 25 – Richland V.F.D.
 26 – Sandy Creek V.F.D.
 27 – Scriba V.F.C.
 28 – Volney V.F.C. (2 Sta.'s)
 29 – West Amboy V.F.D.
 30 – Williamstown V.F.D.
 33 – West Monroe V.F.D.
 34 – Oswego Town V.F.D.
 35 – North Bay V.F.D. (Oneida Co.)
 36 – McConnellsville V.F.D. (Oneida Co.)
 38 – Oswego Co. Fire Control
 46 – Sunoco Ethanol Plant Fire Brigade
 47 – Enterprise Fire Co. #1 (Phoenix, NY) (3 Sta.'s 1 of which is in Onondaga Co.)
 McFee Ambulance (Mexico, NY)
 Menter Ambulance (aka Oswego County Ambulance Service) (Fulton, NY)
 Northern Oswego County Ambulance (N.O.C.A.) (Pulaski, NY)
 North Shore Volunteer Emergency Squad (Cleveland, NY)
 Student Assoc. Volunteer Ambulance Corps (S.A.V.A.C.) (SUNY-Oswego, NY)

Otsego County

 01 – Cherry Valley V.F.D.
 02 – Cooperstown V.F.D.
 03 – East Worcester Hose Co. #1
 04 – Edmeston V.F.D.
 05 – Fly Creek V.F.C.
 06 – Garrattsville V.F.C. Inc.
 07 – Gilbertsville V.F.D.
 08 – Hartwick V.F.D. Co. #1
 09 – Hartwick (Seminary) V.F.D. Co. #2
 10 – Laurens V.F.D.
 11 – Middlefield V.F.D.
 12 – Milford V.F.D.
 13 – Morris V.F.D.
 14 – Mount Vision V.F.D.
 15 – Otego V.F.D.
 16 – Oneonta F.D.
 17 – Richfield Springs V.F.D.
 18 – Schenevus Maryland Fire Dist. (aka C.H. Graham Hose Co.)
 19 – Schuyler Lake V.F.D.
 20 – Springfield V.F.D. (2 Sta.'s)
 21 – Unadilla V.F.D.
 22 – Unadilla Forks V.F.C.
 23 – Wells Bridge V.F.D.
 24 – West Edmeston V.F.D. (2 Sta.'s)
 25 – Westford V.F.D.
 26 – West Laurens V.F.D.
 27 – West Oneonta V.F.D. Inc.
 28 – Worcester Fire Dist. & Emer. Squad
 29 – West Exeter V.F.D.
 30 – Pittsfield V.F.D.
 70 – Oneonta State Emergency Squad
 Cooperstown Medical Transport (CMT Ambulance) ***(Soon to be American Medical Response (A.M.R.))***

Putnam County

 11 – Brewster V.F.D. (2 Sta.'s)
 12 – Carmel V.F.D.
 13 – Cold Spring V.F.C. #1
 14 – Continental Village V.F.D.
 15 – Garrison V.F.C. Inc. (2 Sta.'s)
 16 – Kent V.F.D.
 17 – Lake Carmel V.F.D. Inc.
 18 – Mahopac V.F.D. (3 Sta.'s)
 19 – Mahopac Falls V.F.D. Inc. (2 Sta.'s)
 20 – Nelsonville V.F.D. ****(disbanded)****
 21 – North Highlands Engine Co. #1 
 22 – Patterson V.F.D. #1 Inc. (2 Sta.'s)
 23 – Putnam Lake V.F.D. #2
 24 – Putnam Valley V.F.D. (2 Sta.'s)
 25 thru 30 – NONE
 31 – Carmel V.A.C. 
 32 – Garrison V.A.C.
 33 – Philipstown V.A.C.
 34 – Putnam Valley V.A.C. Inc.
 35 – Putnam Medics
 36 – Town of Patterson Amb.

Rensselaer County

 01 – Averill Park Sand Lake V.F.D. 
 02 – Berlin V.F.C. & Rescue/Squad
 03 – Best Luther V.F.C. (2 Sta.'s)
 04 – Brunswick V.F.C. #1
 05 – Buskirk V.F.D. Inc.
 06 – Castleton V.F.C.
 07 – V.F.C. of Center Brunswick Inc.
 08 – Clinton Heights V.F.C. (3 Sta.'s)
 09 – Defreestville V.F.D.
 10 – Eagle Mills Fire Dist. #1
 11 – East Greenbush V.F.C. Inc. (3 Sta.'s)
 12 – East Schodack V.F.C.
 13 – Grafton V.F.C.
 14 – Hemstreet Park V.F.D.
 15 – Hoags Corners V.F.C. Inc.
 16 – Hoosick V.F.C.
 17 – Hoosick Falls V.F.C.
 18 – Hoosic Valley V.F.C. #1
 19 – Johnsonville V.F.C.
 20 – Melrose V.F.C. Inc.
 21 – Mountain View V.F.C.
 22 – Nassau Hose Co. #1
 23 – North Hoosick V.F.D. Inc.
 24 – Petersburg V.F.D.
 25 – Pittstown V.F.D.
 26 – Pleasantdale V.F.C.
 27 – Poestenkill V.F.C. (2 Sta.'s)
 28 – Raymertown V.F.D.
 29 – Rensselaer F.D. (2 Sta.'s)
 30 – Schaghticoke V.F.D.
 31 – Schodack Landing V.F.C. Inc.
 32 – Schodack Valley V.F.C. Inc.
 33 – Sherwood Park V.F.C. ***(NOW CLOSED)***
 34 – South Schodack V.F.C. Inc.
 35 – Speigletown V.F.C.
 36 – Stephentown V.F.D. Inc.
 37 – Taborton V.F.D.
 38 – Tsatsawassa Protective Fire Co. Inc.
 39 – Troy F.D. (6 Sta.'s)
 40 – Valley Falls V.F.C.
 41 – West Hoosick V.F.D. Inc.
 42 – Wynantskill V.F.D.
 43 – West Sand Lake V.F.D.
 47 – White Creek V.F.C. #1 (Washington Co.)
 50 – Castleton Vol. Amb. Service
 51 – Grafton Vol. Amb.
 52 – Hoags Corners Vol. Amb. Assn. Inc.
 53 – Hoosic Valley Rescue/Squad
 54 – Johnsonville Vol. Amb. Service Inc. ***(NOW CLOSED)***
 55 – North Greenbush Amb. Assoc.
 56 – Petersburg Vol. Amb.
 57 – Pittstown Vol. Emer. Corps
 58 – Rensselaer Vol. Amb.
 59 – Rensselaer Polytechnic Institute Amb. (R.P.I.)
 60 – Sand Lake Amb.
 61 – Town of Hoosick Rescue/Squad
 62 – W.F. Bruen Rescue/Squad
 63 – Empire Amb. Service
 64 – Mohawk Amb. (2 Sta.'s)
 65 – John H. Ahearn Rescue/Squad (Saratoga Co.)
 66 – Capital Dist. Amb. (Albany Co.)
 67 – Nassau Amb.
 68 – Northeast A.L.S. ***(NOW CLOSED)***
 75 – Bennington Rescue/Squad Inc. (Bennington, VT)

Rockland County

 1 – Blauvelt V.F.C. Inc. 
 2 – Central Nyack V.F.D. (aka Central Engine Co. #6)
 3 – Congers V.F.D. (aka Alert Hook, Ladder & Engine Co. #1) (2 Sta.'s)
 4 – Haverstraw V.F.D. (5 Co.'s in 3 Sta.'s)
 5 – Hillburn V.F.D.
 6 – Hillcrest V.F.C. #1 (3 Sta.'s)
 7 – Brewer Fire Engine Co. #1 (Monsey, NY)
 8 – Nanuet Fire Engine Co. #1 Inc. (2 Sta.'s)
 9 – New City Fire Engine Co. #1
 10 – Nyack V.F.D. (8 Co.'s in 6 Sta.'s)
 11 – Orangeburg V.F.D. 
 12 – Pearl River V.F.D. (2 Sta.'s)
 13 – Empire Hose Co. #1 (Piermont, NY)
 14 – Knickerbocker Engine Co. #1 (Valley Cottage, NY)
 15 – Sloatsburg V.F.D. (2 Sta.'s)
 16 – Sparkill Palisades V.F.D. (aka John Paulding Engine Co. #1)
 17 – Spring Valley V.F.D. (4 Sta.'s)
 18 – Stony Point V.F.D. (aka Wayne Hose Co. #1 Inc.) (2 Sta.'s)
 19 – Suffern V.F.D. (2 Sta.'s)
 20 – Tallman V.F.D.
 21 – Volunteer Fire Assoc. of Tappan (2 Sta.'s)
 22 – Valley Cottage Engine Co. #1
 23 – West Haverstraw V.F.D. (2 Sta.'s)
 24 – West Nyack Fire Engine Co. #1 (2 Sta.'s)
 25 – South Spring Valley V.F.C. (aka Hugh Gassner Fire Co. Inc.)
 26 – David B. Roche V.F.C. (3 Sta.'s in Garnerville, Thiells & West Haverstraw)
 31 – Letchworth Village State Hospital F.D. (Thiells, NY) ***(disbanded)***
 32 – Bear Mountain State Park F.D. ***(disbanded)***
 33 – Helen Hayes Rehabilitation Hospital F.D. (West Haverstraw) ***(disbanded)***
 34 – Rockland State Hospital F.D. (Orangeburg, NY) ***(disbanded)***
 35 – Tappan Zee Bridge (N.Y.S. Thruway Authority) ***(disbanded)***
 41 – U.S. Navy Ammunition Depot F.D. (Iona Island) ***(disbanded)***
 44 – Rockland Co. Fire Control (Pomona, NY)
 51 – Lederle Laboratories F.D. (Pearl River) ***(disbanded)***
 52 – Novartis Pharmaceuticals Fire Brigade ***(disbanded)***

Saratoga County

 10/11 – Arvin Hart V.F.C. (aka Stillwater Fire Dist.) (4 Sta.'s)
 12 – 
 Ballston Lake V.F.D.
 Ballston Lake E.M.S.
 13 – 
 Eagle Matt Lee Fire Co. #1 (Ballston Spa)
 Community Emergency Corps (Ballston Spa)
 14 – Union Fire Co. #2 (Ballston Spa)
 15 – NONE
 16 – Burnt Hills V.F.D. Sta. #1
 17 – Burnt Hills V.F.D. Sta. #2
 18 – Charlton Fire Dist. #1
 19 – 
 Clifton Park Halfmoon Fire Dist. #1
 Clifton Park & Halfmoon Emergency Corps
 20 – Jessup's Landing E.M.S.
 21 – 
 Corinth V.F.D.
 Corinth Emergency Squad Inc. (NOW CLOSED)
 22 – 
 Edinburg V.F.C. Inc.
 Edinburg Emergency Squad Inc.
 23 – 
 Galway V.F.C. Inc.
 Galway E.M.S.
 24 – Gansevoort V.F.D.
 25 – NONE
 26 – Greenfield Center V.F.C. #1 (aka Greenfield Fire Dist.)
 27 – Porter Corners V.F.C. #2 (aka Greenfield Fire Dist.)
 28 – Middle Grove V.F.C. #3 (aka Greenfield Fire Dist.)
 29 – Maple Ave. V.F.C. #4 (aka Greenfield Fire Dist.)
 30 – NONE
 31 – Luzerne Hadley Consolidated Fire Dist. & Emergency Squad (aka Van R. Rhodes V.F.C. Inc.) (Warren Co.)
 32 – Halfmoon Waterford Fire Dist. #1 (2 Sta.'s)
 33 – Harmony Corners V.F.D.
 34 – Hillcrest V.F.D.
 35 – NONE
 36 – Jonesville V.F.D. Sta. #1
 37 – Jonesville V.F.D. Sta. #2
 38 – 
 Malta Ridge V.F.C. (2 Sta.'s)
 Malta Stillwater E.M.S.
 39-44 – Mechanicville F.D.
 39 – John H. Ahearn Rescue Squad (NOW CLOSED)
 45 – Round Lake V.F.D. (2 Sta.'s)
 46 – Northside Fire Dist. (aka F.B. Peck Hose Co.) (Waterford)
 47 – 
 Providence V.F.D. (2 Sta.'s)
 Providence V.A.C. Inc.
 48 – NONE
 49/50 – Quaker Springs V.F.D. (2 Sta.'s)
 51 – Rexford Fire Dist. (aka John McLane Hose Co.)
 52 – Riverside Fire Dist. (Disbanded and now Arvin Hart V.F.C. Sta. #4)
 53 – Milton Fire Dist. #1 (aka Rock City Falls V.F.C.) (2 Sta.'s)
 54 – Round Lake V.F.D. (2 Sta.'s)
 55 – Saratoga Springs F.D. Sta. #1
 56 – Saratoga Springs F.D. Sta. #2
 57 – 
 Schuyler Hose Co. (Schuylerville)
 General Schuyler Emergency Squad (Saratoga Springs)
 58 – 
 South Glens Falls V.F.C. Inc. Sta. #1
 Moreau Emergency Squad Inc. (Ft. Edward)
 59 – 
 Stillwater V.F.D. (aka Newland Wood Fire Co.)
 Stillwater Rescue Squad (NOW CLOSED)
 60 – South Glens Falls V.F.C. Sta. #2
 61 – Victory Mills V.F.D. (aka David Nevins Fire Co. #1)
 62/63 – Vischer Ferry V.F.C. (3 Sta.'s)
 64 – 
 Waterford V.F.D. (J.W. Ford Hose Co. #2 – Sta. #2)
 Waterford Rescue Squad Inc.
 65 – NONE
 66 – Waterford V.F.D. (Charles H. Kavanaugh H&L Co. #1 – Sta. #3)
 67 – Waterford V.F.D. (Knickerbocker Steamer Engine #1 – Sta. #1)
 68 – West Charlton V.F.D.
 69 – West Crescent Fire Dist. (aka W.K. Mansfield Hose Co.)
 70 – NONE
 71 – 
 Wilton V.F.D. Sta. #1
 Wilton Emergency Inc.
 72 – Wilton V.F.D. Sta. #2
 73-80 – NONE
 81 – Knolls Atomic Power Lab Fire Brigade (Ballston Spa)
 82 – Momentive Fire Brigade (Waterford)
 83 – Empire Ambulance (2 Sta.'s)
 84 – Tri-State Emergency Team (Waterford)
85 – GlobalFoundries, Emergency Response Team – Fire Brigade

Schenectady County

 City of Schenectady
 Schenectady City F.D. (4 Sta.'s)
 Town of Rotterdam Fire Dist.
 11 – Rotterdam Junction Fire Dist. #1
 12 – Rotterdam Fire Dist. #2
 13 – Carman Fire Dist. #3
 14 – Pattersonville Fire Dist. #4
 15 – Pine Grove Fire Dist. #5
 16 – South Schenectady Fire Dist. #6
 17 – Schonowe Fire Dist. #7
 18 – Plotterkill Fire Dist. #8 (Town of Princetown)
 Town of Glenville Fire Dist.
 21 – Hoffmans Fire Dist. #1 (NOW CLOSED)
 22 – Alplaus Fire Dist. #2
 23 – East Glenville Fire Dist. #3
 24 – Scotia Fire Dist. #4 
 25 – Beukendaal Fire Dist. #5 
 26 – West Glenville Fire Dist. #6
 27 – Thomas Corners Fire Dist. #7
 28 – Glenville Hill Fire Dist. #8
 29 – Rectors Fire Dist. #9 (NOW CLOSED)
 Town of Duanesburg Fire Dist.
 30 – Quaker Street Fire Dist. #1
 32 – Duanesburg Fire Dist. #2
 35 – Delanson Fire Dist. #5
 37 – Mariaville Fire Dist. #7
 Town of Niskayuna Fire Dist.
 40 – Niskayuna Fire Dist. #1 (Sta. #1)
 41 – Niskayuna Fire Dist. #2
 42 – Niskayuna Fire Dist. #1 (Sta. #2)
 43 – Stanford Heights V.F.D. (Albany Co.)
 Industrial Fire Brigades
 70/71 – Stratton Air National Guard F.D. (Glenville)
 81 – Knolls Atomic Power Lab Fire Brigade (Niskayuna)
 82 – General Electric Fire Brigade (Schenectady)
 E.M.S.
 91 – Rotterdam E.M.S. Inc. (2 Sta.'s)
 93 – Duanesburg V.A.C. Inc.
 94 – Niskayuna Ambulance 
 98 – Knolls Atomic Power Lab Ambulance (Niskayuna)
 Mohawk Ambulance (Schenectady)

Schoharie County

 01 – Blenheim Hose Co.
 10 – Jefferson V.F.D. & R/S
 11 – Town of Broome V.F.D. (aka Livingstonville V.F.D.)
 12 – Middleburgh V.F.D.
 13 – Richmondville V.F.C. Inc.
 14 – Schoharie V.F.D. (aka Niagara Eng. Co. #6 Inc.)
 15 – Sharon Springs Joint Fire Dist. & R/S
 16 – Summit V.F.D. & R/S
 17 – West Fulton V.F.D.
 20 – Carlisle V.F.D.
 30 – Central Bridge V.F.D.
 40 – Charlotteville V.F.D.
 48 – Schoharie Co. Fire Coordinator 
 50 – 
 Cobleskill V.F.D.
 Cobleskill R/S
 60 – Conesville Fire Dist. & R/S
 70 – Esperance V.F.D.
 80 – Gallupville V.F.D.
 90 – Huntersland V.F.D.
 94 – Rural/Metro Ambulance ***(NOW CLOSED)***
 94 – A.M.R Ambulance
 96 – Middleburgh Emergency Volunteer Ambulance Corps (M.E.V.A.C.)
 97 – Richmondville Volunteer Emergency Services (R.V.E.S.)
 98 – Scho Wright Ambulance Service

Schuyler County
Department #
 11 – Beaver Dams V.F.D.
 12 – Burdett V.F.D.
 13 – Mecklenburg V.F.C.
 14 – Monterey V.F.C.
 15 – Montour Falls V.F.D.
 16 – Odessa V.F.D.
 17 – Tyrone V.F.C. Inc.
 18 – Valois Logan Hector V.F.C. Inc.
 19 – Watkins Glen V.F.D.
 Schuyler Co. Volunteer Amb. Assoc. (Watkins Glen, NY)
 Hector Volunteer Ambulance

Seneca County
 02 – Border City V.F.D. (2 Sta.'s)
 03 – Canoga V.F.D.
 04 – Fayette V.F.D.
 05 – Interlaken V.F.D.
 07 – Junius V.F.D. (2 Sta.'s)
 08 – Lodi V.F.D.
 09 – Magee V.F.D. – (2 Sta.'s)
 11 – Ovid V.F.D.
 12 – Red Jacket V.F.D. (Merged w/Seneca Falls V.F.D.)
 13 – Romulus V.F.D.
 14 – Seneca Falls V.F.D. (2 Sta.'s)
 15 – Varick V.F.C. (2 Sta.'s)
 16 – Waterloo V.F.D.
 17 – Willard Drug Treatment Center Fire Brigade
 North Seneca Volunteer Ambulance (Waterloo, NY)
 South Seneca Volunteer Ambulance (Ovid, NY)

St. Lawrence County
 02 – Brasher-Winthrop V.F.D.
 03 – Brier Hill V.F.D.
 04 – Canton V.F.D. & Rescue Squad
 05 – Colton V.F.D. (2 Sta.'s)
 06 – Cranberry Lake Fire & Rescue
 07 – DeGrasse Clare & South Russell V.F.D.
 08 – DeKalb Junction V.F.D. Inc.
 09 – Edwards V.F.D.
 10 – Fine V.F.D.
 11 – 
 Gouverneur V.F.D. 
 Gouverneur Rescue Squad Inc.
 12 – Hammond Fire & Rescue Inc.
 13 – Hannawa Falls V.F.D.
 14 – Helena V.F.D.
 15 – Hermon V.F.D.
 16 – Heuvelton V.F.D.
 17 – Hopkinton Fort Jackson V.F.D.
 18 – Lawrenceville V.F.D.
 19 – Lisbon V.F.C.
 20 – Louisville V.F.D. Inc. (2 Sta.'s)
 22 – 
 Madrid V.F.D.
 Madrid Rescue Squad Inc.
 23 – 
 Massena V.F.D.
 Massena Rescue Squad
 24 – Morley V.F.C. Inc. (2 Sta.'s)
 25 – Morristown Vol. Fire/Rescue Co. #1 & Rescue Squad
 26 – Newton Falls V.F.D. Inc.
 27 – Nicholville V.F.D.
 28 – 
 Norfolk V.F.D. (3 Sta.'s)
 Norfolk Rescue Squad
 29 – North Lawrence V.F.D. Inc.
 30 – Norwood V.F.D.
 31 – 
 Ogdensburg F.D.
 Ogdensburg Volunteer Rescue Squad Inc.
 33 – Parishville V.F.C. Inc. & Rescue Squad (2 Sta.'s)
 34 – Piercefield V.F.D.
 35 – Pierrepont V.F.D.
 36 – 
 Potsdam F.D.
 Potsdam Volunteer Rescue Squad (2 Sta.'s)
 37 – Pyrites V.F.D.
 40 – Rensselaer Falls V.F.D.
 41 – Richville V.F.C. Inc.
 42 – Russell V.F.D. & Rescue Squad
 45 – Star Lake V.F.D. Inc.
 46 – 
 Waddington V.F.D.
 Waddington Rescue Squad
 47 – West Potsdam V.F.D.
 48 – West Stockholm V.F.D.
 53 – Tri Town Volunteer Rescue Squad Inc.
 55 – Oxbow V.F.D. (Jefferson Co.)
 57 – Riverview Correctional Facility Fire Brigade (Ogdensburg, NY)
 83 – Corning Inc. Fire Brigade (Canton, NY)
 R.B. Lawrence Ambulance (Canton, NY)
 Seaway Valley Ambulance (Massena, NY)

Steuben County

 01 – Addison V.F.D. (aka Phoenix Hose V.F.C. #2 – 2 Sta.'s)
 02 – Arkport Hose Co. #1 Inc.
 03 – Atlanta-North Cohocton V.F.C. (aka Hatch Hose Co.)
 04 – Avoca Hose Co. #1
 05 – 
 Bath V.F.D.
 Vol. Amb. Corps of Bath NY, Inc.
 06 – Bath V.A. Hospital Fire Brigade
 07 – Bradford V.F.C.
 08 – Cameron V.F.D.
 09 – E.B. Packard Hose Co. Inc. (Campbell, NY)
 10 – Canisteo F.D.
 11 – Caton V.F.D.
 12 – Cohocton V.F.D. & E.M.S.
 13 – Coopers Plains Long Acres V.F.D.
 14 – Corning F.D.
 15 – East Campbell V.F.D.
 16 – East Corning V.F.D.
 17 – Forest View Gang Mills V.F.D. Inc.
 18 – Fremont V.F.D. #1
 19 – Gibson V.F.D. (2 Sta.'s)
 20 – Greenwood V.F.D.
 21 – 
 Citizens Hose Co. Inc. (Hammondsport, NY)
 Hammondsport V.A.C. Inc.
 22 – Hornby V.F.C. Inc.
 23 – Hornell F.D.
 24 – Howard V.F.D.
 25 – Jasper V.F.D.
 26 – Lindley Presho V.F.D. Inc. 
 27 – North Hornell V.F.C.
 28 – Painted Post V.F.D.
 29 – Perkinsville V.F.D. (aka Fearless H&L Co. #1)
 30 – Prattsburgh Protectives V.F.D.
 31 – Pulteney V.F.C.
 32 – West Union V.F.C.
 33 – Savona V.F.D.
 34 – South Corning V.F.D.
 35 – South Dansville V.F.C. #1 Inc.
 36 – South Hornell V.F.C.
 37 – Thurston V.F.D.
 38 – Troupsburg V.F.D.
 39 – Tuscarora V.F.D.
 40 – Wallace V.F.D.
 41 – Wayland V.F.D.
 42 – Woodhull V.F.D.
 43 – North Corning V.F.D.
 44 – Kanona V.F.D.
 45 – Wayne V.F.C.
 American Medical Response (A.M.R. – Corning, NY)
 Springwater/Wayland E.M.S.

Suffolk County
1-0-0 First Division, Town Of Babylon
1-1-0 – Amityville V.F.D. (3 Sta.'s)
1-2-0 – Babylon V.F.D. (3 Sta.'s)
1-3-0 – Copiague V.F.D. (2 Sta.'s)
1-4-0 – Deer Park V.F.D. (2 Sta.'s)
1-5-0 – East Farmingdale V.F.C. Inc. (4 Sta.'s)
1-6-0 – Lindenhurst V.F.D. (5 Sta.'s)
1-7-0 – North Amityville V.F.C. Inc. (2 Sta.'s)
1-8-0 – North Babylon V.F.C. Inc. (5 Sta.'s)
1-9-0 – West Babylon V.F.D. (3 Sta.'s)
1-10-0 – Wyandanch V.F.C. Inc. (3 Sta.'s)
1-11-0 – North Lindenhurst V.F.C. Inc. (2 Sta.'s)
1-20-0 – Wyandanch-Wheatley Heights Ambulance Corps (1 Sta.)
1-22-0 – Republic Airport A.R.F.F. (1 Sta.)

2-0-0 Second Division, Town Of Huntington
2-1-0 – Cold Spring Harbor V.F.D. (1 Sta.)
2-2-0 – Halesite V.F.D. (1 Sta.)
2-3-0 - Huntington V.F.D. (2 Sta.'s)
2-4-0 – Huntington Manor V.F.D. (3 Sta.'s)
2-5-0 – Melville V.F.D. (4 Sta.'s)
2-6-0 – Centerport V.F.D. (2 Sta.'s)
2-7-0 – Greenlawn V.F.D. Inc. (2 Sta.'s)
2-8-0 – Dix Hills V.F.D. (3 Sta.'s)
2-9-0 – Northport V.F.D. (2 Sta.'s)
2-10-0 – East Northport V.F.D. (2 Sta.'s)
2-11-0 – Commack V.F.D. Inc. (4 Sta.'s)
2-12-0 – Eatons Neck V.F.D. (1 Sta.) 
2-13-0 – Northport Veteran's Administration Hospital F.D. (1 Sta.)
2-15-0 – Huntington Community First Aid Squad Inc. (1 Sta.)
2-16-0 – Commack Volunteer Ambulance Corps (1 Sta.)

3-0-0 Third Division, Town Of Islip
3-1-0 – Bay Shore V.F.D. (3 Sta.'s)
3-2-0 – Brentwood V.F.D. (5 Sta.'s)
3-3-0 – East Brentwood V.F.D. (1 Sta.)
3-4-0 – Islip V.F.D. (2 Sta.'s)
3-5-0 – East Islip V.F.D. (1 Sta.)
3-6-0 – Islip Terrace V.F.D. (2 Sta.'s)
3-7-0 – Central Islip V.F.D. (3 Sta.'s)
3-8-0 – Hauppauge V.F.D. (3 Sta.'s)
3-9-0 – Great River V.F.D. (1 Sta.)
3-10-0 – West Sayville V.F.D. (2 Sta.'s)
3-11-0 – Sayville V.F.D. (2 Sta.'s)
3-12-0 – Bohemia V.F.D. (2 Sta.'s)
3-13-0 – Lakeland V.F.D. (3 Sta.'s)
3-14-0 – Bayport V.F.D. (1 Sta.)
3-15-0 – Holbrook V.F.D. (3 Sta.'s)
3-16-0 – Fair Harbor V.F.D. (1 Sta.)
3-17-0 – West Islip V.F.D. (2 Sta.'s)
3-18-0 – Saltaire V.F.C. (1 Sta.)
3-20-0 – Ocean Beach V.F.D. (1 Sta.)
3-21-0 – Kismet V.F.D. (2 Sta.'s)
3-22-0 – McArthur Airport A.R.F.F. (1 Sta.)
3-23-0 – Dunewood V.F.D. (Merged w/Fair Harbor V.F.D.)
3-24-0 – Bay Shore-Brightwaters Rescue Ambulance Inc. (1 Sta.)
3-25-0 – Brentwood Legion Ambulance (1 Sta.)
3-26-0 – Central Islip-Hauppauge Volunteer Ambulance Corps Inc. (1 Sta.) 
3-27-0 – Exchange Ambulance of the Islips (1 Sta.)
3-28-0 – Community Ambulance Co. Inc. (1 Sta.)

4-0-0 Fourth Division, Town Of Smithtown
4-1-0 – Kings Park V.F.D. (1 Sta.)
4-2-0 – Smithtown V.F.D. (3 Sta.'s)
4-3-0 – Saint James V.F.D. Inc. (2 Sta.'s)
4-4-0 – Nesconset V.F.D. (2 Sta.'s)
4-5-0 – Nissequogue V.F.D. (1 Sta.)

5-0-0 Fifth Division, Town Of Brookhaven
5-1-0 – Bellport V.F.D. (1 Sta.)
5-2-0 – Blue Point V.F.D. (1 Sta.)
5-3-0 – Brookhaven V.F.D. (2 Sta.'s)
5-4-0 – Center Moriches V.F.D. (1 Sta.)
5-5-0 – Centereach V.F.D. (3 Sta.'s)
5-6-0 – Coram V.F.D. (3 Sta.'s)
5-7-0 – East Moriches V.F.D. (1 Sta.)
5-8-0 – Eastport V.F.D. (1 Sta.)
5-9-0 – Gordon Heights V.F.D. (1 Sta.)
5-10-0 – Hagerman V.F.D. (1 Sta.)
5-11-0 – Holtsville V.F.D. (1 Sta.)
5-12-0 – Mastic V.F.D. (2 Sta.'s)
5-13-0 – Mastic Beach V.F.D. (1 Sta.)
5-14-0 – Medford V.F.D. (3 Sta.)
5-15-0 – Middle Island V.F.D. (2 Sta.'s)
5-16-0 – Manorville V.F.D. (3 Sta.'s)
5-17-0 – North Patchogue V.F.D. (3 Sta.'s)
5-18-0 – Farmingville V.F.D. (2 Sta.'s)
5-19-0 – Patchogue V.F.D. (2 Sta.'s)
5-20-0 – Brookhaven National Laboratory F.D. (1 Sta.)
5-21-0 – Point O'Woods V.F.D. (1 Sta.)
5-22-0 – Ridge V.F.D. (3 Sta.'s)
5-24-0 – Ronkonkoma V.F.D. (1 Sta.)
5-25-0 – Selden V.F.D. (3 Sta.'s)
5-26-0 – Cherry Grove V.F.D. (1 Sta.)
5-27-0 – Davis Park V.F.D. (1 Sta.)
5-28-0 – Fire Island Pines V.F.D. (1 Sta.)
5-29-0 – Ocean Bay Park V.F.D. (1 Sta.)
5-30-0 – Yaphank V.F.D. (1 Sta.)
5-33-0 – Port Jefferson E.M.S. (1 Sta.)
5-34-0 – Medford Volunteer Ambulance Inc. (2 Sta.'s)
5-35-0 – Stony Brook Volunteer Ambulance Corps (1 Sta.)
5-37-0 – Mastic Volunteer Ambulance Co. (1 Sta.)
5-38-0 – Shirley Community Ambulance Co. (1 Sta.)
5-39-0 – Mastic Beach Volunteer Ambulance Corps (1 Sta.)
5-40-0 – Manorville Community Ambulance (2 Sta.)
5-42-0 – South Country Ambulance Co. (3 Sta.'s)
5-47-0 – East Moriches Community Ambulance (2 Sta.'s)
5-49-0 – Patchogue Ambulance Co. (1 Sta.)
5A-1-0 – Port Jefferson V.F.D. (1 Sta.)
5A-2-0 – Setauket V.F.D. (3 Sta.'s)
5A-3-0 – Stony Brook V.F.D. (2 Sta.'s)
5A-4-0 – Terryville V.F.D. (3 Sta.'s)
5A-5-0 – Mount Sinai V.F.D. (2 Sta.'s)
5A-6-0 – Sound Beach V.F.D. (2 Sta.'s)
5A-7-0 – Rocky Point V.F.D. (3 Sta.'s)
5A-9-0 – Miller Place V.F.D. (2 Sta.'s)

6-0-0 Sixth Division, Town Of Riverhead
6-1-0 – Jamesport V.F.D. (2 Sta.'s)
6-2-0 – Riverhead V.F.D. (4 Sta.'s)
6-3-0 – Wading River V.F.D. (2 Sta.'s)
6-4-0 – Calverton V.F.D. (disbanded and became Riverhead V.F.D. Sta. #3)
6-5-0 – Riverhead Volunteer Ambulance Corps Inc. (2 Sta.'s)
6-6-0 – Peconic Ambulance Service (disbanded)

7-0-0 Seventh Division, Town Of Southampton
7-1-0 – Sag Harbor V.F.D. (4 Sta.'s)
7-2-0 – Bridgehampton V.F.D. (1 Sta.)
7-3-0 – Southampton V.F.D. (4 Sta.'s)
7-4-0 – North Sea V.F.D. (2 Sta.'s)
7-5-0 – Hampton Bays V.F.D. (2 Sta.'s)
7-6-0 – East Quogue V.F.D. (2 Sta.'s)
7-7-0 – Quogue V.F.D. (1 Sta.)
7-8-0 – Westhampton Beach V.F.D. (2 Sta.'s)
7-9-0 – Flanders V.F.D. (1 Sta.)
7-10-0 – 106th Rescue Wing F.D. (aka Gabreski A.N.G. F.D.) (1 Sta.)
7-12-0 – Hampton Bays Volunteer Ambulance Corps (2 Sta.'s)
7-14-0 – Southampton Volunteer Ambulance (1 Sta.)
7-15-0 – Sag Harbor Volunteer Ambulance Corps (1 Sta.)
7-16-0 – Westhampton War Memorial Ambulance Assoc. Inc. (1 Sta.)
7-17-0 – Flanders Northampton Volunteer Ambulance Co. Inc. (1 Sta.)
7-18-0 – Southampton Village Volunteer Ambulance (1 Sta.)

8-0-0 Eighth Division, Town Of Southold
8-1-0 – Orient V.F.D. (1 Sta.)
8-2-0 – East Marion V.F.D. (1 Sta.)
8-3-0 – Greenport V.F.D. (2 Sta.'s)
8-4-0 – Southold V.F.D. (2 Sta.'s)
8-5-0 – Cutchogue V.F.D. (1 Sta.)
8-6-0 – Mattituck V.F.D. (1 Sta.)
8-7-0 – Fishers Island V.F.D. (1 Sta.)
8-8-0 – Plum Island F.D. (1 Sta.)

9-0-0 Ninth Division, Town Of East Hampton
9-1-0 – East Hampton V.F.D. & Ambulance (1 Sta.)
9-2-0 – Amagansett V.F.D. (1 Sta.)
9-3-0 – Montauk V.F.D. (2 Sta.'s)
9-4-0 – Springs V.F.D. (1 Sta.)

10-0-0 Tenth Division, Town Of Shelter Island
10-1-0 – Shelter Island V.F.D. (3 Sta.'s)
10-2-0 – Shelter Island Heights V.F.D. (disbanded and now Shelter Island V.F.D. Sta. #3)
10-4-0 – Shelter Island Town Ambulance (1 Sta.)

11-0-0 Eleventh Division, Private Ambulance Co.'s
 Hunter E.M.S. (Bay Shore)

Sullivan County

 10 – Hortonville V.F.C. (Battalion 1)
 11 – Hurleyville V.F.D. (Battalion 3)
 12 – 
 Jeffersonville V.F.D. (Battalion 4)
 Jeffersonville Vol. First Aid Corps Inc. (District 4)
 13 – Kauneonga Lake V.F.D. (Battalion 4)
 14 – Kenoza Lake V.F.D. (Battalion 4)
 15 – 
 Lake Huntington V.F.C. Inc. (2 Sta.'s)/(Battalion 1)
 Town of Cochecton V.A.C. (District 4)
 16 – Lava V.F.D. (Battalion 1)
 17 – Liberty V.F.D. (Battalion 2)
 18 – 
 Livingston Manor V.F.D. Inc. (Battalion 2)
 Livingston Manor V.A.C. (District 2)
 19 – Long Eddy Hose Co. (Battalion 1)
 20 – 
 Loch Sheldrake V.F.D. (Battalion 3)
 Town of Liberty V.A.C. Inc. (District 2)
 21 – 
 Lumberland V.F.D. Inc. (2 Sta.'s)/(Battalion 1)
 Lumberland V.F.D. Inc. Amb. (District 1)
 22 – Monticello V.F.D. (Battalion 4)
 23 – 
 Mountaindale V.F.C. #1 (Battalion 3)
 Mountaindale First Aid Squad (District 3)
 24 – 
 Narrowsburg V.F.D. (Battalion 1)
 Tusten V.A.S. (District 1)
 25 – 
 Neversink V.F.D. (Battalion 3)
 Neversink V.F.D. Amb. (District 2)
 26 – North Branch V.F.D. Inc. (Battalion 2)
 27 – 
 Rock Hill V.F.D. (Battalion 5)
 Rock Hill V.A.C. (District 5)
 29 – 
 Roscoe-Rockland V.F.D. (Battalion 2)
 Roscoe-Rockland V.A.C. (District 2)
 30 – Smallwood Mongaup Valley V.F.C. (Battalion 4)
 31 – Fallsburg V.F.D. (Battalion 3)
 32 – Summitville V.F.C. #1 (Battalion 5)
 33 – Swan Lake V.F.D. (Battalion 4)
 34 – Westbrookville V.F.C. #1 Inc. (Battalion 5)
 35 – 
 White Lake V.F.C. Inc. (Battalion 4)
 Bethel V.A.C. (District 4)
 36 – White Sulphur Springs V.F.D. Inc. (Battalion 2)
 37 – 
 Woodbourne V.F.C. #1 (Battalion 3)
 Woodbourne V.F.C. #1 Amb. (District 3)
 38 – Woodridge V.F.D. (Battalion 3)
 39 – 
 Wurtsboro V.F.C. #1 (Battalion 5)
 Mamakating First Aid Squad (District 5)
 40 – Youngsville V.F.D. (Battalion 2)
 42 – Yulan V.F.D. Inc. (3 Sta.'s)/(Battalion 1)
 43 – American Legion Post 1363 Ambulance (Highland)/(District 1)
 45 – Mobile Life Support Services (Countywide)/(District 5)
 46 – Regional E.M.S. (disbanded)/(District 5)
 47 – Catskills Hatzalah E.M.S. (Countywide but Sta. is in Fallsburg)/(District 5)
 51 – MobileMedic E.M.S. (Hurleyville)/(District 5)
 53 – 
 Sullivan Co. 9-1-1 (Battalion 4)
 Sullivan Co. Training Facility (Battalion 4)
 Sullivan Co. Airport A.R.F.F. (Battalion 4)
 61 – Beaverkill Valley V.F.C. Inc. (Battalion 2)
 62 – Bloomingburg V.F.C. #1 (Battalion 5)
 63 – 
 Callicoon V.F.D. (Battalion 1)
 Upper Delaware V.A.C. (District 4)
 64 – Callicoon Center V.F.D. Inc. (Battalion 2)
 65 – Claryville V.F.D. (2 Sta.'s)/(Battalion 3)/(Ulster Co.)
 66 – Forestburgh V.F.C. #1 (Battalion 5)
 67 – 
 Grahamsville V.F.D. (Battalion 3)
 Grahamsville First Aid Squad (District 2)
 68 – Hankins-Fremont V.F.D. (Battalion 1)
 69 – Highland Lake V.F.D. (Battalion 1)
 75 – LifeNet Medevac (Countywide)/(District 5)

Tioga County
 01 – Apalachin V.F.D. & Emergency Squad (3 Sta.'s)
 02 – Berkshire V.F.C.
 03 – Campville V.F.D. Inc. (3 Sta.'s)
 04 – 
 Candor V.F.D. (3 Sta.'s)
 Candor Emergency Squad Inc.
 05 – Halsey Valley V.F.D.
 06 – Newark Valley V.F.D. Inc.
 07 – Nichols V.F.D. & Emergency Squad
 08 – Owego V.F.D. & Emergency Squad (4 Sta.'s)
 09 – Richford V.F.D.
 10 – 
 Spencer V.F.D.
 Spencer Emergency Squad
 11 – Tioga Center V.F.D. & Emergency Squad
 12 – 
 Greater Valley E.M.S. (Sayre, PA)
 Van Etten V.F.D. (Chemung Co.)
 13 – Waverly Barton V.F.D. (2 Sta.'s)
 14 – Weltonville V.F.C.
 17 – Lockheed Martin Fire Brigade (disbanded)
 18 – Southside V.F.C. (Owego, NY)
 19 – Lockwood V.F.C.
 20 – Berkshire Emergency Squad Inc.

Tompkins County
 1 – Brooktondale V.F.C. Inc.
 2 – Cayuga Heights V.F.C. #1
 3 – Etna V.F.D.
 4 – Danby V.F.C.
 5 – 
 Neptune Hose Co. #1 Inc. (Dryden, NY)
 Dryden Ambulance Inc.
 6 – Enfield V.F.C. Inc.
 7 – W.B. Strong Fire Co. Inc. (Freeville, NY)
 8 – Groton V.F.D.
 9 – ** Ithaca F.D. (4 Sta.'s)
 Bangs Ambulance (Ithaca, NY)
 11 – Lansing V.F.D. (4 Sta.'s)
 12 – McLean V.F.D.
 13 – Newfield V.F.C
 14 – West Danby V.F.D.
 15 – Slaterville V.F.D. & Ambulance
 17 – Speedsville V.F.C.
 18 – Trumansburg V.F.D. & Ambulance
 19 – Varna V.F.C. Inc.
 22 – Ithaca Tompkins Regional Airport Crash/Fire/Rescue
 24 – Cornell University E.M.S. (Ithaca, NY)

Ulster County
 15 – Accord Fire District (3 Sta.'s)
 17 – Big Indian Fire Department
 18 – Bloomington Fire Department (2 Sta.'s)
 19 – Centerville-Cedar Grove Fire Company (2 Sta.'s)
 21 – Clintondale Fire Company
 22 – Connelly, New York Hasbrouck Engine Company #1
 23 – Cottekill Fire Department
 24 – Cragsmoor Fire Company
 25 – East Kingston Fire Company (2 Sta.'s)
 26 – Ellenville Fire Department (4 Sta.'s)
 27 – Esopus Fire Company
 28 – Gardiner Fire Department (2 Sta.'s)
 29 – Glasco Fire Company
 30 – High Falls Fire Department
 31 – Highland Fire Company (2 Sta.'s)
 32 – Hurley Fire Department
 33 – Kerhonkson, New York Fire Company
 34 – Kripplebush-Lyonsville Fire Company
 35 – Lomontville Fire Company
 36 – Malden-West Camp Fire Department (2 Sta.'s)
 37 – Marbletown Fire Company
 38 – Marlboro Hose Company #1
 39 – Milton Engine Company #1
 40 – Modena Fire & Rescue
 41 – Mt. Marion Fire Department
 42 – Napanoch Fire Company (2 Sta.'s)
 43 – New Paltz Fire Department (2 Sta.'s)
 44 – Olive Fire Department #1 Inc. (5 Sta.'s)
 45 – Phoenicia Fire Department (3 Sta.'s)
 46 – Pine Hill Fire Company #1 Inc.
 47 – Plattekill Fire Department (2 Sta.'s)
 48 – Port Ewen Fire Department (2 Sta.'s)
 49 – Rifton Fire Department (2 Sta.'s)
 50 – Rosendale Fire Department
 51 – Ruby Fire Company
 52 – St. Remy Fire Department (2 Sta.'s)
 53 – Saugerties Fire Department (2 Sta.'s)
 54 – Sawkill Fire District #1
 55 – Saxton-Katsbaan Fire Company (2 Sta.'s)
 56 – Ulster County, New York Emergency Communications Center
 57 – Shawangunk Valley Fire Department
 58 – Stone Ridge Fire Company
 59 – Spring Lake Fire Company
 60 – Tilson Fire Department
 61 – Ulster Hose Company #5 Inc. (2 Sta.'s)
 62 – Vly Atwood Fire Department
 63 – Walker Valley Chemical Engine Company #1
 64 – Wallkill Hook, Ladder & Hose Company
 65 – Claryville Fire Department
 66 – West Hurley Fire Company #1 (3 Sta.'s)
 67 – Woodstock Fire District (5 Sta.'s)
 68 – Kingston Fire Company
 71 – Kerhonkson Accord First Aid Squad Inc.
 72 – Marbletown First Aid Unit
 73 – Olive First Aid Unit (2 Sta.'s)
 74 – Ellenville First Aid & Rescue Squad Inc.
 75 – Town of Esopus Volunteer Ambulance Squad Inc. (T.E.V.A.S.)
 76 – Wallkill Volunteer Ambulance Corps
 77 – Town of Marlboro Volunteer Ambulance (Now Mobile Life Support Services)
 78 – Town of Shandaken Ambulance Service (2 Sta.'s)
 79 – Diaz Memorial Ambulance Service Inc. (Saugerties)
 80 – New Paltz Rescue/Squad
 82 – Transcare E.M.S. (Wappingers Falls)
 83 – Mobile Life Support Services (2 Sta.'s)

Warren County

 Bakers Mills-Sodom V.F.C.
 Bay Ridge V.F.C. Inc. 
 Bolton V.F.C. & Emergency Squad (2 Sta.'s)
 Chestertown V.F.C. Inc.
 Empire Ambulance (Closed in 2023)
 Garnet Lake V.F.D.
 Glens Falls F.D. (2 Sta.'s)
 Hague V.F.D. Inc. & Emergency Squad (2 Sta.'s)
 Horicon V.F.D. Inc. (2 Sta.'s)
 Johnsburg V.F.C. Inc.
 Johnsburg Emergency Squad Inc.
 Lake George V.F.D.
 Lake George Emergency Squad
 Luzerne-Hadley Consolidated Fire Dist. & Emergency Squad
 North Creek V.F.C. Inc.
 North Queensbury V.F.C.
 North River V.F.C.
 North Warren Emergency Squad
 Pottersville V.F.D.
 Queensbury Central V.F.C. Inc. (2 Sta.'s)
 Queensbury EMS (2 Sta.'s) (Merger between Nort Queensbury Rescue Squad and Bay Ridge Rescue Squad) 
 Riverside V.F.D. Inc.
 South Queensbury V.F.C. Inc.
 Stony Creek V.F.C. Inc. & Emergency Squad
 Thurman V.F.C. Inc.
 Thurman E.M.S. ***(disbanded)***
 Warrensburg V.F.D.
 Warrensburg E.M.S. Inc.
 West Glens Falls V.F.C. #1 Inc. (2 Sta.'s)
 West Glens Falls Emergency Squad
 Wevertown V.F.C. ***(disbanded)***

Washington County

 21 – 
 J.A. Barkley Hose Co. #1 Inc. (aka Argyle Fire & Rescue)
 Argyle E.M.S.
 22 – 
 Cambridge V.F.D.
 Cambridge Valley Rescue Squad Inc.
 23 – Cossayuna V.F.D.
 24 – Dresden V.F.C. #1
 25 – Easton V.F.C. Inc. (2 Sta.'s)
 26 – 
 Fort Ann V.F.C. Inc.
 Fort Ann Rescue Squad Inc.
 27 – 
 Fort Edward V.F.D. (2 Sta.'s)
 Fort Edward Rescue Squad Inc.
 28 – Granville Engine & Hose Co. #1
 29 – 
 Granville Hook & Ladder Co. Inc.
 Norton Hose Co. ***disbanded***
 Granville Rescue Squad Inc.
 31 – Great Meadow Correctional Facility ***disbanded***
 32 – 
 Greenwich V.F.D.
 Easton-Greenwich Rescue Squad
 33 – Hampton V.F.C. Inc.
 34 – Hartford V.F.C. Inc.
 35 – Hebron V.F.C. Inc. (2 Sta.'s)
 36 – Hudson Falls V.F.D.
 37 – Huletts Landing V.F.C.
 38 – Kingsbury Volunteer Hose Co. #1 Inc. (2 Sta.'s)
 39 – Middle Falls V.F.D.
 41 – Penrhyn Engine & Hose V.F.C. Inc.
 42 – North Granville Hose Co. Inc.
 43 – Putnam V.F.C.
 44 – 
 Salem V.F.D. Inc.
 Salem Rescue Squad
 45 – Shushan V.F.C. Inc.
 46 – West Fort Ann V.F.C. Inc.
 47 – White Creek V.F.C. #1
 48 – Whitehall V.F.C. Inc.
 49 – 
 Skenesborough Central V.F.C.
 Skenesborough Emergency Squad
 51 – Dorset Fire Dist. #1 (Bennington Co., VT)
 52 – 
 Fair Haven V.F.D. (Rutland Co., VT)
 Fair Haven Rescue Squad (Rutland Co., VT)
 53 – Middletown Springs V.F.D. (Rutland Co., VT)
 54 – Pawlet V.F.D (Rutland Co., VT)
 55 – 
 Poultney V.F.D. (aka Poultney Hose Co. #1) (Rutland Co., VT)
 Poultney Rescue Squad (Rutland Co., VT)
 56 – Rupert V.F.C. (Bennington Co., VT) 
 57 – Wells V.F.D. Inc. (Rutland Co., VT)
 58 – West Pawlet V.F.D. (Rutland Co., VT)
 59 – East Dorset Fire Dist. #1 (Bennington Co., VT)
 71 – Bay Ridge V.F.C. Inc. (Warren Co., NY)
 72 – Bay Ridge Rescue Squad Inc. (Warren Co., NY)
 73 – Buskirk V.F.D. (Rensselaer Co., NY)
 74 – EMPTY (Formerly Empire Ambulance prior to closure in 2023)
 79 – Arlington Rescue Squad (Bennington Co., VT)
 86 – Moreau Emergency Squad (Ft. Edward (Saratoga Co., NY))
 87 – South Queensbury V.F.C. Inc. (Warren Co., NY)
 88 - Pilot Knob V.F.D.
 89 - 
 Ticonderoga Fire (Essex County)
 Ticonderoga EMS (Essex County) 
 Lamoille Ambulance Service (Essex County)

Wayne County
 01 – Alton V.F.D.
 02 – Clyde Dept. of Fire-Rescue Services
 03 – East Palmyra V.F.D. Inc.
 04 – East Williamson Fire Dist.
 05 – Fairville V.F.D.
 06 – Lincoln V.F.D.
 07 – Lyons V.F.D.
 08 – Macedon V.F.D. (disbanded & now South Macedon Fire/Rescue)
 09 – Macedon Center V.F.D.
 10 – Marion V.F.D. Inc. & V.A.C. Inc. 
 11 – Newark V.F.D.
 12 – North Rose V.F.D.
 13 – Ontario V.F.C. (2 Sta.'s)
 14 – Palmyra V.F.D.
 15 – Pultneyville V.F.C.
 16 – Red Creek V.F.D.
 17 – Rose V.F.C. Inc.
 18 – Savannah V.F.C. Inc.
 19 – Sodus V.F.D.
 20 – South Butler Fire Dist.
 21 – Sodus Center V.F.D.
 22 – Sodus Point V.F.D.
 23 – Union Hill V.F.D. (disbanded)
 24 – Wallington V.F.D.
 25 – Walworth V.F.D. & Amb.
 26 – West Walworth V.F.D.
 27 – Williamson V.F.D.
 28 – Wolcott V.F.D.
 29 – None
 30 – Marbletown V.F.D.
 31 – South Macedon Fire/Rescue
 59 – Wayne Co. 9-1-1 Center
 Eastern Wayne EMS
 Lakeshore Volunteer Ambulance (Formerly Wolcott Area Volunteer Ambulance Corps)
 Town of Lyons Ambulance
 Macedon Town Ambulance
 Newark Arcadia Volunteer Ambulance (N.A.V.A.)
 Ontario Volunteer Emergency Squad (O.V.E.S.)
 Silver Waters Community Ambulance Service (Sodus Point, NY)
 Sodus Town Ambulance Corps (S.T.A.C.)
 Union Hill Ambulance
 Williamson Volunteer Ambulance Service (W.V.A.S.)

Westchester County

Battalion 10
 208 – Croton On Hudson V.F.D. (3 Sta.'s)
 227 – Cortlandt Engine Co. Inc. (aka Montrose V.F.D.)
 234 – Peekskill V.F.D. 
 249 – Verplanck V.F.D. (2 Sta.'s)
 255 – Buchanan Engine Co. #1 Inc. 
 257 – Montrose V.A. Hosp. F.D.
 265 – Indian Point Power Authority Fire Brigade
 480 – Montrose V.A. E.M.S.
 550 – Croton On Hudson E.M.S.
 750 – Peekskill Comm. V.A.C.
 830 – Verplanck V.F.D. Amb.
 880 – Cortlandt Comm. V.A.C. Inc.

Battalion 11
 219 – Hawthorne V.F.C. #1
 237 – Pleasantville V.F.D. (2 Sta.'s)
 247 – Thornwood V.F.D. (2 Sta.'s)
 248 – Valhalla V.F.D. (3 Sta.'s)
 254 – Grasslands Fire Brigade (2 Sta.'s)
 630 – Hawthorne V.F.C. Amb.
 760 – Pleasantville V.A.C.
 820 – Valhalla V.A.C. Inc.

Battalion 12
 205 – Briarcliff Manor V.F.D. (2 Sta.'s)
 231 – Sleepy Hollow V.F.D. (3 Sta.'s)
 233 – Ossining V.F.D. (7 Sta.'s)
 238 – Pocantico Hills V.F.D. (aka Hilltop Engine Co. #1)
 261 – Sing Sing Correctional Facility 
 263 – Archville V.F.D.
 530 – Briarcliff Manor V.F.D. Amb.
 730 – Sleepy Hollow V.A.C.
 740 – Ossining V.A.C. Inc.

Battalion 13
 207 – Croton Falls V.F.D. (2 Sta.'s)
 214 – Golden's Bridge V.F.D.
 240 – Pound Ridge V.F.D.
 244 – Somers V.F.D. Inc. (4 Sta.'s)
 245 – South Salem V.F.D.
 256 – Vista V.F.D.
 670 – Lewisboro V.A.C.
 720 – North Salem V.A.C.
 780 – Pound Ridge V.A.C.
 800 – Somers V.F.D. Inc. Amb.
 840 – Vista V.F.D. Amb.

Battalion 14
 201 – Ardsley V.F.D. 
 209 – Dobbs Ferry V.F.D. (2 Sta.'s)
 211 – Elmsford V.F.D. (3 Sta.'s)
 212 – Fairview V.F.D. (2 Sta.'s)
 217 – Hartsdale V.F.D. (2 Sta.'s)
 218 – Hastings On Hudson V.F.D. (4 Sta.'s)
 220 – Irvington V.F.D.
 246 – Tarrytown V.F.D. (5 Sta.'s)
 500 – Ardsley Secor V.A.C.
 560 – Dobbs Ferry V.A.C. Inc.
 580 – Elmsford V.F.D. Amb.
 590 – Greenburgh Police E.M.S.
 620 – Hastings On Hudson V.F.D. Amb. Corps
 640 – Irvington V.A.C.
 810 – Tarrytown V.A.C.

Battalion 15
 216 – Harrison V.F.D.
 222 – Larchmont V.F.D.
 223 – Town of Mamaroneck V.F.D.
 224 – Mamaroneck Village V.F.D. (4 Sta.'s)
 239 – Port Chester V.F.D. (4 Sta.'s)
 242 – Rye F.D. (2 Sta.'s)
 266 – Rye Brook F.D.
 610 – Harrison E.M.S.
 660 – Larchmont V.A.C.
 680 – Mamaroneck E.M.S.
 770 – Port Chester-Rye-Rye Brook E.M.S.

Battalion 16
 202 – Armonk V.F.D.
 203 – Bedford Hills V.F.D.
 204 – Bedford V.F.D.
 206 – Chappaqua V.F.D. (2 Sta.'s)
 221 – Katonah V.F.D. 
 228 – Mount Kisco V.F.D. (3 Sta.'s)
 258 – Banksville Independent Fire Co. Inc.
 262 – Bedford Hills Correctional Facility
 400 – Westchester E.M.S. 
 510 – Armonk V.F.D. Amb.
 520 – Bedford V.F.D. Amb.
 540 – Chappaqua V.A.C.
 650 – Katonah Bedford Hills V.A.C.
 700 – Mount Kisco V.A.C.

Battalion 17
 213 – Continental Village V.F.D.
 225 – Millwood V.F.C. #1 Inc. (2 Sta.'s)
 226 – Mohegan V.F.A. Inc. (4 Sta.'s)
 253 – Yorktown Heights Engine Co. #1 (3 Sta.'s)
 690 – Mohegan V.F.A. Amb. Corps
 860 – Yorktown V.A.C.

Battalion 18
 210 – Eastchester F.D. (5 Sta.'s)
 215 – Greenville F.D.
 229 – Mount Vernon F.D. (4 Sta.'s)
 230 – New Rochelle F.D. (5 Sta.'s)
 235 – Pelham F.D. 
 236 – Pelham Manor V.F.D.
 252 – Yonkers Fire Department (12 Sta.'s)
 300 – Empress E.M.S. (2 Sta.'s both in New Rochelle)
 320 – Empress E.M.S. (Mt. Vernon)
 330 – Empress E.M.S. (Yonkers)
 570 – Eastchester V.A.C.

Battalion 19
 232 – North White Plains V.F.C. #1
 241 – Purchase V.F.D.
 243 – Scarsdale V.F.D. (3 Sta.'s)
 250 – West Harrison V.F.D.
 251 – White Plains F.D. (7 Sta.'s)
 259 – Westchester Co. Airport A.R.F.F.
 310 – Empress E.M.S. (White Plains)
 790 – Scarsdale V.A.C.

Wyoming County

 Arcade V.F.D.
 Attica V.F.D. Inc. (2 Sta.'s)
 Bennington V.F.C. Inc.
 Castile V.F.D.
 Cowlesville V.F.C. Inc.
 Eagle Hose Co. #1 (aka Bliss V.F.C.)
 Gainesville V.F.D.
 Genesee Falls V.F.C. Inc. ***(disbanded)***
 Harris Corners V.F.D.
 North Java V.F.C. Inc. (2 Sta.'s)
 Perry V.F.D.
 Perry Emer. Amb. Inc.
 Perry Center V.F.D.
 Pike V.F.D.
 Sheldon V.F.C.
 Silver Springs V.F.D.
 Strykersville V.F.C. (2 Sta.'s)
 Varysburg V.F.D.
 Warsaw V.F.D. & Rescue/Squad (2 Sta.'s)
 Wyoming Hook & Ladder Inc. (2 Sta.'s)

Yates County
 01 – Bellona Fire Dist.
 02 – Benton V.F.D. Inc.
 03 – Branchport/Keuka Park V.F.D. (2 Sta.'s)
 04 – Dresden V.F.D.
 05 – Dundee V.F.D. & Amb.
 06 – Himrod V.F.D.
 07 – None
 08 – Middlesex Hose Co. Inc.
 09 – Penn Yan F.D.
 10 – Potter V.F.D.
 11 – Rushville Hose Co. (Ontario Co.)
 12 thru 17 – none
 18 – Maxfield Hose Co. Inc. (2 Sta.'s – Ontario Co.)
 Middlesex Valley Vol. Amb. Service Inc.
 Penn Yan Area Vol. Amb. Corps Inc.

See also

 List of fire departments
 New York Fire Patrol

References

 
New York